= Kosmos 21 =

Soviet spacecraft

- Mission type: Deep space and return to Earth (test for Venus impact)
- Operator: OKB-1
- COSPAR ID: 1963-044A
- SATCAT no.: 00687
- Mission duration: 3 days

Spacecraft properties
- Spacecraft type: 3MV-1A
- Manufacturer: OKB-1
- Launch mass: 890 kg

Start of mission
- Launch date: 11 November 1963; 06:23:34 GMT
- Rocket: Molniya 8K78M s/n G103-18
- Launch site: Baikonur, Site 1/5
- Contractor: OKB-1

End of mission
- Disposal: Upper stage failure
- Decay date: 14 November 1963

Orbital parameters
- Reference system: Geocentric
- Regime: Low Earth
- Perigee altitude: 182 km
- Apogee altitude: 216 km
- Inclination: 64.8°
- Period: 88.5 minutes
- Epoch: 11 November 1963

Kosmos 21 (Russian: Космос 21 meaning Cosmos 21), also known as 3MV-1A and 3MV-1 No.1, was a Soviet spacecraft. This mission has been tentatively identified by NASA as a technology test of the Venera series space probes. It may have been an attempted Venus impact, presumably similar to the later Kosmos 27 mission, or it may have been intended from the beginning to remain in geocentric orbit. In any case, the spacecraft never left Earth orbit after insertion by the Molniya launcher. The orbit decayed on 14 November 1963, three days after launch.

== Launch ==
Kosmos 21 was launched at 06:23:34 GMT on 11 November 1963, atop a Molniya 8K78 s/n G103-18 carrier rocket flying from Site 1/5 at the Baikonur Cosmodrome.

== Spacecraft designation ==
Beginning in 1963, the name Kosmos was given to Soviet spacecraft which remained in Earth orbit, regardless of whether that was their intended final destination. The designation of this mission as an intended planetary probe is based on evidence from Soviet and non-Soviet sources and historical documents. Typically Soviet planetary missions were initially put into an Earth parking orbit as a launch platform with a rocket engine and attached probe. The probes were then launched toward their targets with an engine burn with a duration of roughly 4 minutes. If the engine misfired or the burn was not completed, the probes would be left in Earth orbit and given a Kosmos designation.

The spacecraft's original development name before being given the Kosmos 21 denomination once it reached orbit was 3MV-1 No.1.

== Design ==
This was the first "third-generation" deep space planetary probes of the 3MV series of the Soviet Union. Like the second generation 2MV probes, Soviet engineers planned four types of the 3MV, the 3MV-1 (for Venus impact), 3MV-2 (for Venus flyby), 3MV-3 (for Mars impact), and 3MV-4 (for Mars flyby). The primary difference over the second-generation was vastly improved (and in many cases doubled) orientation system elements as well as improved onboard propulsion systems. While these four versions were meant to study Mars and Venus, the Soviets conceived of two additional variants of the series, similar but not identical to the 3MV-1 and 3MV-4 versions, with the designations 3MV-1A and 3MV-4A.

These "Object-Probes" (ob'yekt-zond) were designed to verify key technological systems during simpler missions into deep space and back to Earth. A government decree on 21 March 1963 had approved two to three such "object-probe" missions, one of which (a 3MV-1A) was designed to depart from Earth's ecliptic (the orbital plane of Earth around the Sun) out to 12–16 million kilometres from Earth and then return to Earth after about six months when its orbit intersected with that of Earth again, aided by two mid-course corrections using its S5.45 main engine. The latter, capable of two firings, was a lighter version of that used on the 2MV model with higher specific impulse and longer burn time.

== Failure ==
During this mission, the third and fourth stages separated abnormally, and after reaching Earth orbit, ground control lost telemetry (at 06:45:44 GMT) from the Blok L upper stage designed to send the vehicle past the Moon. As a result, the spacecraft remained stranded in Earth orbit. The main engine turbopump of stage probably exploded upon ignition destroying the spacecraft. On 11 November 1963, it had a perigee of 182 kilometres (113 mi) and an apogee of 216 kilometres (134 mi), with an inclination of 64.8°, and an orbital period of 88.5 minutes. The spacecraft was decay on 14 November 1963. With this mission, the Soviets began the practice of giving Kosmos designations to obscure the failure of lunar and planetary probes that remained stranded in Earth orbit. If the spacecraft had successfully departed from Earth orbit, it would probably have been called Zond 1.

== Scientific Instruments ==
The spacecraft bus included a variety of scientific instruments:

- Radiation detector
- Charged particle detector
- Magnetometer
- Piezoelectric detector
- LA-2 atomic hydrogen detector
- Kassiopeya radio telescope
- RSK-2M ultraviolet and Roentgen solar radiation experiment
- VIKT-2 vapour friction technology experiment
- plasma engines

== See also ==
- List of missions to Venus
