= Zond 1 =

Soviet spacecraft launched in 1964 to explore Venus

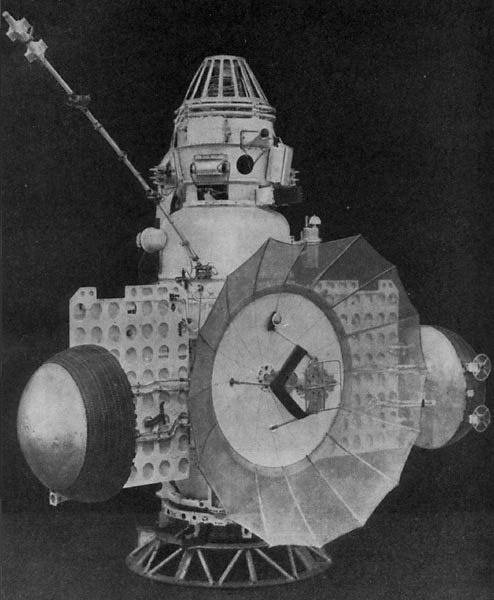
- The Russian Zond 1
- Names: Zond 3MV-1 No. 4
- Mission type: Venus lander
- Operator: OKB-1
- COSPAR ID: 1964-016D
- SATCAT no.: 00785
- Mission duration: 1 month and 21 days

Spacecraft properties
- Bus: 3MV-1
- Launch mass: 948 kg (2,090 lb)
- Dry mass: 290 kilograms (640 lb)
- Dimensions: 3.6 m (12 ft) tall 1.1 m (3 ft 7 in) diameter

Start of mission
- Launch date: April 2, 1964, 02:42:40; 62 years ago
- Rocket: Molniya 8K78M
- Launch site: Baikonur LC-1/5

End of mission
- Last contact: May 24, 1964

Orbital parameters
- Reference system: Heliocentric
- Perihelion altitude: 0.652 AU
- Aphelion altitude: 1.001 AU
- Inclination: 3.7°
- Period: 274 days

Flyby of Venus
- Closest approach: July 19, 1964
- Distance: 100,000 km (62,000 mi)

Zond 1 was a spacecraft of the Soviet Zond program. It was the second Soviet research spacecraft to reach Venus, although communications had failed by that time. It carried a 90-centimetre (35 in) spherical landing capsule, containing experiments for chemical analysis of the atmosphere, gamma-ray measurements of surface rocks, a photometer, temperature and pressure gauges, and a motion/rocking sensor in case it landed in water. An experimental Ion thruster was also carried for evaluation.

== Spacecraft design ==
The Zond-1 was a 3MV design, the second generation inter-planetary Soviet bus, improving over the 2MV design used for previous Mars and Venus missions. However, more importantly, significant advancements were in the 8K78 Molniya launch vehicle whose Block-L (upper stage) had crippled half a dozen interplanetary missions before. The new version of the launch vehicle was named 8K78M Molniya.

On either side of the spacecraft, two solar panels were attached providing a total of about 4 meters squared of surface area. Attached to the ends of the solar panels were hemispherical radiators which provided thermal control to the spacecraft's internal systems. A 2 meter high-gain directional antenna was placed on the anti-sun side. Various low-gain antennas were placed throughout the spacecraft to provide omnidirectional communications capability.

== Scientific Instruments ==
The spacecraft included scientific instruments on both its bus, which would complete a flyby of Venus, and its lander.

Bus:

- Radiation detector
- Charged-particle detector
- Magnetometer
- Piezoelectric detector
- Atomic hydrogen detector

Lander:

- Barometer
- Thermometer
- Radiation detector
- Micro-organism detection experiment
- Atmospheric composition experiment
- Acidity measurement experiment
- Electro-conductivity experiment
- Luminosity experiment

== Mission ==
=== Launch ===
The spacecraft, a Venera 3MV-1 No.4, was launched on April 2, 1964, from Tyuratam and this time the launch vehicle performed flawlessly. After the launch, during the spacecraft's first communications session, ground controllers detected a leak that was letting air escape from the pressurized orbital compartment. The orbital compartment housed all of the electronics of the bus which required to be pressurized to function. This was a serious problem as Soviet electronics relied on vacuum tubes which would overheat without cooling air. Using the leak's spin on the spacecraft, the ground crew determined that the leak originated from a bad weld near the quartz window for the probe’s star and Sun sensors and that the orbital compartment would be completely depressurized in just 1 week. 1 Day after launch, the first mid-course correction was completed successfully.

=== Cruise to Venus ===
By April 9th, the pressure was so low that on board sensors could not detect it. The pressurized chamber was required for the main transmitter to provide thermal control and to prevent arcing. To remain in contact with the spacecraft, the ground controllers routed signals though a pair of redundant transmitters on the lander. On May 14th the second mid-course correction occurred but the engine cut off prematurely, only completing 30m/s of change in velocity out of the designed 50m/s. This meant that the spacecraft would still miss Venus by 100,000km. An ill-timed command from ground control turned on its radio system while there was still a rarefied atmosphere inside, causing the electronics to short out by corona discharge. By mid-April, the electronics in the main spacecraft had completely failed and all signal transmission ceased, but communication via the lander could still be performed, and space radiation and atomic-hydrogen spectrometer measurements were received. The experimental ion thruster-based attitude control system were also tested but found to operate erratically, possibly due to the loss of pressure in the electronics compartment. One of the star tracker's glass cover cracked, forcing ground controllers to place Zond 1 into a spin-stabilization mode. Communication with the spacecraft could be maintained until mid-June, a full month before the Venus flyby, when the spacecraft would be too far away to receive its signals from the lander's antennas. However, all communications had failed by May 24. It passed 100,000 kilometres (62,000 mi) from Venus on July 14, 1964. Even if the lander was successfully detached, it would have been crushed at 35km altitude as the conditions on Venus were far harsher than expected.

Chief Designer Sergei Korolev was upset at the failure of the mission and demanded higher quality control from the OKB-1 Bureau, including X-rays to test for pressure leaks.

A similar design of landing capsule was used in Venera 3.

=== Naming ===
Zond missions were presented as engineering tests by the Soviet Union and to an extent at least that may have been the case. Western observers at the time suggested that the name was used as a cover for failed missions in the same manner that Kosmos designations were used for missions that failed to leave Earth orbit. More recently it has been suggested that "Zond" was genuinely the internal program designation for engineering tests but Zond 1 would have been upgraded to Venera had it been more successful. Zond 1 was actually the second craft that was meant to carry the Zond name, but its predecessor failed to leave Earth orbit and was designated Kosmos 21.

== See also ==
- List of missions to Venus

Preceded by None	Zond program (interplanetary)	Succeeded by Zond 2
