= Kosmos 96 =

Failed Soviet space probe

- Mission type: Venus flyby
- Operator: OKB-1
- COSPAR ID: 1965-094A
- SATCAT no.: 01742
- Mission duration: 16 days

Spacecraft properties
- Spacecraft type: 3MV-4
- Manufacturer: OKB-1
- Launch mass: 6510 kg
- Dry mass: 960 kg

Start of mission
- Launch date: 23 November 1965; 03:22:00 GMT
- Rocket: Molniya 8K78 s/n U15000-30
- Launch site: Baikonur, Site 31/6
- Contractor: OKB-1

End of mission
- Disposal: Launch failure
- Decay date: 9 December 1965

Orbital parameters
- Reference system: Geocentric
- Regime: Low Earth
- Perigee altitude: 227 km
- Apogee altitude: 310 km
- Inclination: 51.9°
- Period: 89.8 minutes
- Epoch: 23 November 1965

Kosmos 96 (Russian: Космос 96 meaning Cosmos 96), or 3MV-4 No.6, was a Soviet spacecraft intended to explore Venus. A 3MV-4 spacecraft launched as part of the Venera programme, Kosmos 96 was to have made a flyby of Venus. However, due to a launch failure, it did not depart low Earth orbit. Its re-entry into Earth's atmosphere is often speculated as the cause of the Kecksburg UFO incident.

== Mission ==
This was the third and last spacecraft prepared for a Venus encounter for the 1965 launch window. The 3MV-4 No.6 spacecraft was originally built for a mission to Mars with launch scheduled for late 1964. After it was not launched by the end of its launch window, the spacecraft was repurposed, along with two other spacecraft which were launched as Venera 2 and Venera 3, to explore Venus.

== Instruments ==
The eight scientific instruments were:

- Three-component magnetometer
- An imaging system
- A solar X-radiation detector
- Cosmic ray gas-discharge counters
- Piezoelectric detectors
- Ion traps
- A photon Geiger counter
- Cosmic radio emission receivers

== Launch ==
A Molniya 8K78 s/n U15000-30 carrier rocket was used to launch 3MV-4 No.6. The launch occurred from Site 31/6 at the Baikonur Cosmodrome at 03:22 GMT on 23 November 1965. Late in third stage flight, a fuel line ruptured, causing one of the engine's combustion chambers to explode. The rocket tumbled out of control, and as a result the fourth stage, a Blok-L, failed to ignite. The spacecraft was deployed into a low Earth orbit with a perigee of 227 kilometres (141 mi), an apogee of 310 kilometres (190 mi), an 51.9° of inclination, and an orbital period of 89.8 minutes. The spacecraft was named Kosmos 96, part of a series typically used for military and experimental satellites in order to cover up the failure. Had it departed Earth's orbit, it would have received the next designation in the Venera series, at the time Venera 4. Kosmos 96 was destroyed when it re-entered the Earth's atmosphere on 9 December 1965.

== The Great Lakes fireball and Kecksburg incident ==
There is some speculation that the re-entry of the Kosmos 96 (Venera-type spacecraft) was responsible for a fireball that was seen over southwestern Ontario, Canada, and at least eight US states from Michigan to New York at 21:43 GMT on 9 December 1965. Investigations of photographs and sightings of the fireball indicated its path through the atmosphere was probably too steep to be consistent with a spacecraft re-entering from Earth orbit and was more likely a meteor in a prograde orbit from the vicinity of the asteroid belt, and probably ended its flight over western Lake Erie. U.S. Air Force tracking data on Kosmos 96 also indicate the spacecraft orbit decayed earlier than 21:43 GMT on 9 December 1965. Other unconfirmed reports state the fireball subsequently landed in Pennsylvania southeast of Pittsburgh near the town of Kecksburg (40.2 N, 79.5 W) at 21:46 EST (although estimating the impact point of fireballs from eyewitness accounts is notoriously inaccurate). Uncertainties in the orbital information and re-entry coordinates and time make it difficult to determine definitively if the fireball could have been the Kosmos 96 spacecraft.

== See also ==
- List of missions to Venus
