= Venera 8 =

Soviet probe

- Mission type: Venus lander
- Operator: Lavochkin
- COSPAR ID: 1972-021A
- SATCAT no.: 5912
- Mission duration: Travel: 117 days Lander: 50 minutes

Spacecraft properties
- Spacecraft: 3MV No. 670
- Manufacturer: Lavochkin
- Launch mass: 1,184 kilograms (2,610 lb)
- Landing mass: 495 kilograms (1,091 lb)

Start of mission
- Launch date: 27 March 1972, 04:15:06 UTC
- Rocket: Molniya-M/MVL
- Launch site: Baikonur 31/6

End of mission
- Last contact: 22 July 1972 at 09:32 UT (landing) + 50 min., 11 sec. when transmission ended

Orbital parameters
- Reference system: Geocentric
- Semi-major axis: 6,591 kilometres (4,095 mi)
- Eccentricity: 0.03732
- Perigee altitude: 194 kilometres (121 mi)
- Apogee altitude: 246 kilometres (153 mi)
- Inclination: 51.7°
- Period: 88.9 minutes
- Epoch: 27 March 1972

Venus lander
- Landing date: 22 July 1972, 09:32 UTC
- Landing site: 10.70°S 335.25°E

Venera 8 (Russian: Венера-8 meaning Venus 8) was a probe in the Soviet Venera program for the exploration of Venus and was the second robotic space probe to conduct a successful landing on the surface of Venus.

Venera 8 was a Venus atmospheric probe and lander. Its instrumentation included temperature, pressure, and light sensors as well as an altimeter, gamma ray spectrometer, gas analyzer, and radio transmitters.

== Journey to Venus ==
The spacecraft took 117 days to reach Venus with one mid-course correction on 6 April 1972, separating from the bus (which contained a cosmic ray detector, solar wind detector, and ultraviolet spectrometer) and entering the atmosphere on 22 July 1972 at 08:37 UT. A refrigeration system attached to the bus was used to pre-chill the descent capsule's interior prior to atmospheric entry in order to prolong its life on the surface. Descent speed was reduced from 41,696 km/h to about 900 km/h by atmospheric drag deceleration. The 2.5 meter diameter parachute opened at an altitude of 60 km.

== Descent ==
Venera 8 transmitted data during the descent. A sharp decrease in illumination was noted at 35 to 30 km altitude and wind speeds of less than 1 m/s were measured below 10 km. Venera 8 landed at 09:32 UT in what is now called Vasilisa Regio, within 150 km radius of 10.70°S 335.25°E, in sunlight, about 500 km from the morning terminator. The lander mass was 495 kg.

== Lander ==
The lander continued to send back data for 50 minutes, 11 seconds after landing before failing due to the harsh surface conditions. The probe confirmed the earlier data on the high Venus surface temperature and pressure (470 °C, 90 atmospheres) returned by Venera 7, and also measured the light level as being suitable for surface photography, finding it to be similar to the amount of light on Earth on an overcast day with roughly 1 km visibility.

Venera 8's photometer measurements showed for the first time that the Venusian clouds end at a high altitude, and the atmosphere was relatively clear from there down to the surface. The on-board gamma ray spectrometer measured the uranium/thorium/potassium ratio of the surface rock, indicating it was similar to alkali basalt.

== Payload experiments ==
- Temperature and pressure sensors - ITD
- Accelerometer - DOU-1M
- Cadmium sulfide Photometers - IOV-72
- Ammonia analyser – IAV-72
- Gamma ray spectrometer – GS-4
- Radar altimeter Auxiliary thruster
- Radio Doppler experiment

== See also ==
- List of missions to Venus
- Timeline of artificial satellites and space probes
