= List of missions to Venus =

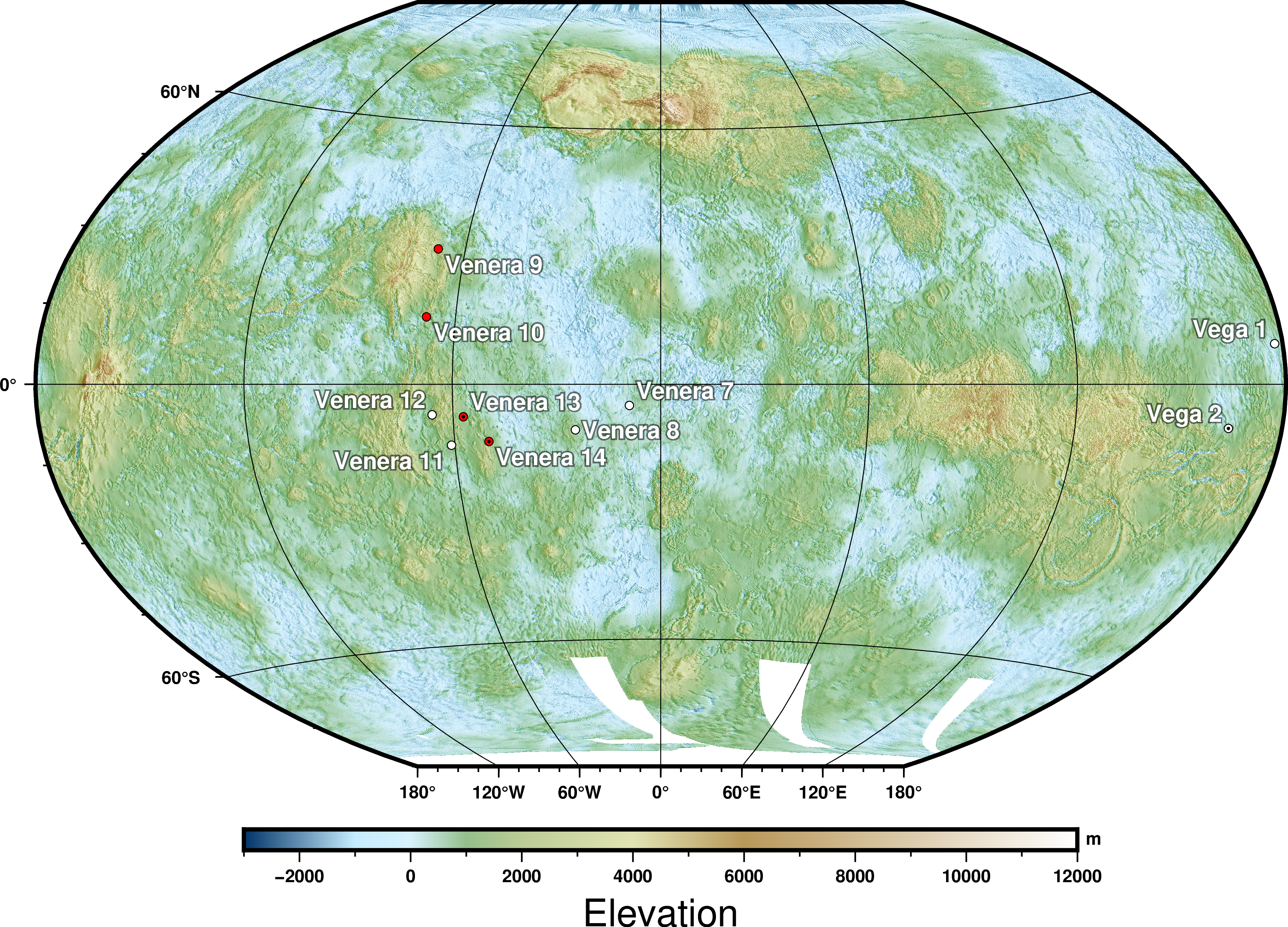
Global topographic map of Venus, with all the Soviet probe landings marked (red: returned images; with additional black dot: analyzed samples).

There have been 47 space missions to the planet Venus (including gravity-assist flybys). Missions to Venus constitute part of the exploration of Venus. The Soviet Union, followed by the United States, have soft landed probes on the surface. Venera 7 was the first lander overall and first for the Soviet Union, touching down on 15 December 1970. Pioneer Venus 2 contained the first spacecraft to land from the United States, the Day Probe. It soft landed on 9 December 1978. The most recent lander was part of the Vega 2 mission, which soft landed on 15 June 1985.

== List ==
As of 2020, the Soviet Union, United States, European Space Agency and Japan have conducted missions to Venus.

Mission Type Legend
Mission to Venus
Gravity assist, destination elsewhere

Spacecraft		Launch date	Operator	Mission	Outcome	Remarks	Carrier rocket
1	Tyazhely Sputnik (1VA No.1)	4 February 1961	OKB-1; Soviet Union	Impactor	Launch failure	Power transformer failure, upper stage failed to ignite, never left LEO	Molniya
2	Venera 1 (1VA No.2)	12 February 1961	OKB-1; Soviet Union	Impactor	Spacecraft failure	Communications failure. First flyby past another planet, on 19 May 1961 at less than 100,000 kilometres (62,000 mi); no data returned	Molniya
3	Mariner 1 (P-37)	22 July 1962	NASA; United States	Flyby	Launch failure	Failed to orbit Earth; destroyed by range safety following guidance failure	Atlas-LV3 Agena-B
4	2MV-1 No.1	25 August 1962	OKB-1; Soviet Union	Lander	Launch failure	Premature upper stage cutoff due to ullage motor malfunction; never left LEO	Molniya
5	Mariner 2 (P-38)	27 August 1962	NASA; United States	Flyby	Successful	First successful flyby past another planet on 14 December 1962	Atlas-LV3 Agena-B
6	2MV-1 No.2	1 September 1962	OKB-1; Soviet Union	Lander	Launch failure	Upper stage fuel valve failed to open, resulting in failure to ignite; never left LEO	Molniya
7	2MV-2 No.1	12 September 1962	OKB-1; Soviet Union	Flyby	Launch failure	Anomalous third stage cutoff resulted in air bubbles forming in fourth stage fuel; fourth stage shut down less than a second after ignition; failed to leave LEO	Molniya
8	3MV-1 No.2	19 February 1964	OKB-1; Soviet Union	Flyby	Launch failure	Third stage oxidizer leak caused propellant to freeze in feed lines, which subsequently cracked; failed to orbit	Molniya-M
9	Kosmos 27 (3MV-1 No.3)	27 March 1964	OKB-1; Soviet Union	Flyby/Lander	Launch failure	Upper stage attitude control failure, never left LEO	Molniya-M
10	Zond 1 (3MV-1 No.4)	2 April 1964	OKB-1; Soviet Union	Flyby/Lander	Spacecraft failure	Electronics shorted out, communications lost before flyby. Flew past Venus on 14 July 1964.	Molniya-M
11	Venera 2 (3MV-4 No.4)	12 November 1965	OKB-1; Soviet Union	Flyby	Spacecraft failure	Flew past Venus on 27 February 1966, closest approach at 02:52 UTC. Communications lost after flyby, before any data could be returned.	Molniya-M
12	Venera 3 (3MV-3 No.1)	16 November 1965	OKB-1; Soviet Union	Lander	Spacecraft failure	Communications lost as soon as spacecraft entered atmosphere on 1 March 1966, no data returned. First atmospheric entry and impact on another planet.	Molniya-M
13	Kosmos 96 (3MV-4 No.6)	23 November 1965	OKB-1; Soviet Union	Flyby	Launch failure	Third stage combustion chamber exploded, resulting in loss of control, upper stage failed to ignite; Never left LEO	Molniya-M
14	Venera 4 (4V-1 No.310)	12 June 1967	Lavochkin; Soviet Union	Atmospheric	Successful	Returned atmospheric data during entry on 18 October 1967. First successful atmospheric entry. Never intended to work on surface	Molniya-M
15	Mariner 5	14 June 1967	NASA; United States	Flyby	Successful	Flyby on 19 October 1967, closest approach at 17:34:56 UTC	Atlas SLV-3 Agena-D
16	Kosmos 167 (4V-1 No.311)	17 June 1967	Lavochkin; Soviet Union	Lander	Launch failure	Upper stage failed to ignite; turbopump cooling malfunction. Never left LEO	Molniya-M
17	Venera 5 (4V-1 No.330)	5 January 1969	Lavochkin; Soviet Union	Atmospheric	Successful	Entered atmosphere on 16 May 1969, operated for 53 minutes	Molniya-M
18	Venera 6 (4V-1 No.331)	10 January 1969	Lavochkin; Soviet Union	Atmospheric	Successful	Entered atmosphere on 17 May 1969, operated for 51 minutes	Molniya-M
19	Venera 7 (4V-1 No.630)	17 August 1970	Lavochkin; Soviet Union	Lander	Partial success	Landed at 05:37:10 UTC on 15 December 1970, rolled upon landing and returned severely limited data. First soft landing on another planet.	Molniya-M
20	Kosmos 359 (4V-1 No.631)	22 August 1970	Lavochkin; Soviet Union	Lander	Launch failure	Never left LEO	Molniya-M
21	Venera 8 (4V-1 No.670)	27 March 1972	Lavochkin; Soviet Union	Lander	Successful	Landed at 09:32 UTC on 22 July 1972. First fully successful landing on another planet.	Molniya-M
22	Kosmos 482 (4V-1 No.671)	31 March 1972	Lavochkin; Soviet Union	Lander	Launch failure	Never left LEO	Molniya-M
23	Mariner 10	3 November 1973	NASA; United States	Flyby	Successful	Flyby on 5 February 1974; closest approach at 17:01 UTC; observed Venus and performed gravity assist to reach Mercury	Atlas SLV-3D Centaur-D1A
24	Venera 9 (4V-1 No.660)	8 June 1975	Lavochkin; Soviet Union	Orbiter/Lander	Successful	Entered orbit on 20 October 1975; lander landed at 05:13 UTC on 22 October. First orbiter of Venus and first images from the surface of another planet.	Proton-K/D
25	Venera 10 (4V-1 No.661)	14 June 1975	Lavochkin; Soviet Union	Orbiter/Lander	Successful	Entered orbit on 23 October 1975; lander landed at 05:17 UTC on 25 October	Proton-K/D
26	Venera 11 (4V-1 No.360)	9 September 1978	Lavochkin; Soviet Union	Flyby/Lander	Mostly successful	Flyby on 25 December; Lander landed at 03:24 UTC the same day. Multiple instrument failures on lander	Proton-K/D-1
27	Venera 12 (4V-1 No.361)	14 September 1978	Lavochkin; Soviet Union	Flyby/Lander	Mostly successful	Lander landed at 03:20 UTC on 21 December 1978. Both cameras on lander failed	Proton-K/D-1
28	Pioneer Venus 1 (PV Orbiter)	20 May 1978	NASA; United States	Orbiter	Successful	Entered orbit on 4 December 1978, decayed on 22 October 1992	Atlas SLV-3D Centaur-D1AR
29	Pioneer Venus 2 (PV Multiprobe)	8 August 1978	NASA; United States	Atmospheric	Successful	Entered the atmosphere on 9 December 1978; consisted of five spacecraft, two of which continued transmitting after reaching the surface	Atlas SLV-3D Centaur-D1AR
30	Venera 13 (4V-1M No.760)	30 October 1981	Lavochkin; Soviet Union	Flyby/Lander	Successful	Lander landed at 03:20 UTC on 1 March 1982. First recording of sounds from another planet.	Proton-K/D-1
31	Venera 14 (4V-1M No.761)	4 November 1981	Lavochkin; Soviet Union	Flyby/Lander	Successful	Lander landed on 5 March 1982.	Proton-K/D-1
32	Venera 15 (4V-2 No.860)	2 June 1983	Lavochkin; Soviet Union	Orbiter	Successful	Entered orbit 10 October 1983, operated until July 1984	Proton-K/D-1
33	Venera 16 (4V-2 No.861)	7 June 1983	Lavochkin; Soviet Union	Orbiter	Successful	Entered orbit 11 October 1983, operated until July 1984	Proton-K/D-1
34	Vega 1 (5VK No.901)	15 December 1984	Lavochkin; Soviet Union	Flyby/Atmospheric/Lander	Mostly successful	Landed 11 June 1985. Atmospheric probe deployed during entry operated for two days. Main bus continued to explore comet 1P/Halley	Proton-K/D-1
35	Vega 2 (5VK No.902)	21 December 1984	Lavochkin; Soviet Union	Flyby/Atmospheric/Lander	Successful	Landed 15 June 1985. Atmospheric probe deployed during entry operated for two days. Main bus continued to explore comet 1P/Halley	Proton-K/D-1
36	Magellan	4 May 1989	NASA; United States	Orbiter	Successful	Entered orbit 10 October 1990, deorbited 13 October 1994	Space Shuttle Atlantis; STS-30 / IUS
-	Galileo	18 October 1989	NASA; United States	Gravity assist at Venus	Successful	Flyby on 10 February 1990 en route to Jupiter; observed Venus during closest pass.	Space Shuttle Atlantis; STS-34 / IUS
-	Cassini	15 October 1997	NASA; United States	Gravity assist	Successful	Flybys on 26 April 1998 and 24 June 1999 en route to Saturn; observed Venus during closest pass.	Titan IV(401)B
-	MESSENGER	3 August 2004	NASA; United States	Gravity assist	Successful	Flybys on 24 October 2006 and 5 June 2007 en route to Mercury; observed Venus during closest pass.	Delta II 7925H
37	Venus Express	9 November 2005	ESA	Orbiter	Successful	Entered orbit 11 April 2006. Full communications lost on 28 November 2014	Soyuz-FG/Fregat
38	Akatsuki	20 May 2010	JAXA; Japan	Orbiter	Mostly successful	Flew past Venus on 6 December 2010 after failing to enter orbit. Insertion was successfully reattempted on 7 December 2015. Last contact April 2024	H-IIA 202
39	IKAROS	20 May 2010	JAXA; Japan	Flyby	Successful	Experimental solar sail released from the Akatsuki spacecraft. Flew past Venus on 8 December 2010 but did not make observations.	H-IIA 202
40	Shin'en	20 May 2010	UNISEC; Japan	Flyby	Spacecraft failure	Communications never established after launch. Flew past Venus in December 2010	H-IIA 202
-	Parker Solar Probe	12 August 2018	NASA; United States	Gravity assist	Operational	Flybys on 10 October 2018, 26 December 2019, 11 July 2020, 20 February 2021, 16 October 2021, 21 August 2023, and 6 November 2024 to lower perihelion for solar observation.	Delta IV Heavy/Star 48BV
-	BepiColombo	20 October 2018	ESA	Gravity assist	Successful	Flybys on 15 October 2020 and 11 August 2021 en route to Mercury; observed Venus during closest pass.	Ariane 5 ECA
-	Solar Orbiter	10 February 2020	ESA	Gravity assist	Operational	Flybys on 27 Dec 2020, 8 Aug 2021, 3 Sep 2022, 18 Feb 2025, 24 Dec 2026, 17 Mar 2028, 10 Jun 2029, and 2 Sep 2030 to adjust orbital inclination.	Atlas V 411
-	Juice	31 August 2025	ESA	Gravity assist	Successful	Flyby en route to Jupiter.	Ariane 5 ECA+

== Statistics ==
=== Launches by decade ===
Launches to Venus
Decade
1960s	18
1970s	11
1980s	7
1990s	0
2000s	1
2010s	3
2020s	0

This is a list of 40 missions (including failed ones) to Venus. It includes Flybys (not gravity assists), Impact probes, orbiters, landers, rovers by decade.

=== Mission milestone by country ===
Legend

Achieved
Failed attempt
† First to achieve

Country	Flyby	Orbit	Atmospheric entry	Impact	Lander	Rover
Soviet Union	Venera 1, 1961 †	Venera 9, 1975 †	Venera 3, 1966 †	Venera 3, 1966 †	Venera 7, 1970 †	—N/a
United States	Mariner 2, 1962	Pioneer Venus 1, 1978	Pioneer Venus 2, 1978	Pioneer Venus 2, 1978	Pioneer Venus 2, 1978	—N/a
ESA	Venus Express, 2006	Venus Express, 2006	—N/a	—N/a	—N/a	—N/a
Japan	Akatsuki, 2010	Akatsuki, 2015	—N/a	—N/a	—N/a	—N/a

=== By organization ===
Country	Agency or company	Successful	Partial failure	Failure	Operational	Gravity assist	Total
(Soviet Union) USSR	Energia	-	-	11	-	-	11
(Soviet Union) USSR	Lavochkin	14	1	3	-	-	18
USA	NASA	6	-	1	1	4	11
ESA	ESA	1	-	-	1	2	3
Japan	JAXA	1	-	-	-	-	2
Japan	UNISEC	-	-	1	-	-	1

== Future missions ==
=== Under development ===
Name	Operator	Proposed launch date	Type	Status	Reference
Venus Life Finder	(United States) (New Zealand) MIT/Rocket Lab	NET 2027	Atmospheric probe	under development - waiting rocket readiness	
Venus Orbiter Mission	(India) ISRO	2028	Orbiter/atmospheric probe	under development	
MBR Explorer	(United Arab Emirates) UAESA	NET 2028	Flyby	under development	
DAVINCI	(United States) NASA	2030	Atmospheric probe	under development	
EnVision	ESA	2032	Orbiter	under development	
VERITAS	(United States) NASA	2032	Orbiter	under development	

=== Proposed missions ===
Name	Operator	Proposed launch year	Type	Status	Reference
Atmospheric sample return mission	(China) CNSA	2030s	Sample return	Proposed	
VERVE	(United Kingdom) ESA	2031	CubeSat	Proposed	
Venera-D	(Russia) Roscosmos	2036	Orbiter and lander	Proposed	
VOICE	(China) CNSA	2026	Orbiter	Not selected	
AREE	(United States) NASA	2020	Wind-powered surface rover	Concept study	
CUVE	(United States) NASA	2017	Orbiter	Not selected	
EVE	ESA	2005	Orbiter/Lander/Balloon	Not selected	
HAVOC	(United States) NASA	2015	Crewed aircraft	Concept study	
HOVER	(United States) NASA	2019	Orbiter	Concept study	
VAMP	(United States) NASA	2012	Inflatable semi-buoyant aircraft	Not selected	
VICI	(United States) NASA	2027	Lander	Not selected	
VISAGE	(United States) NASA	2027	Lander	Not selected	
VISE	(United States) NASA	2003	Lander	Not selected	
VMPM	(United States) NASA	1994	Atmospheric probes	Concept study	
VOX	(United States) NASA	2017	Orbiter	Not selected	
Zephyr	(United States) NASA	2016	Sail-driven surface rover	Feasibility study	

== See also ==
- Timeline of Solar System exploration
  - List of missions to the Moon
  - List of missions to Mars
  - List of missions to minor planets
  - List of missions to the outer planets
  - List of missions to comets
