= Venera program =

Soviet program that explored Venus with multiple probes

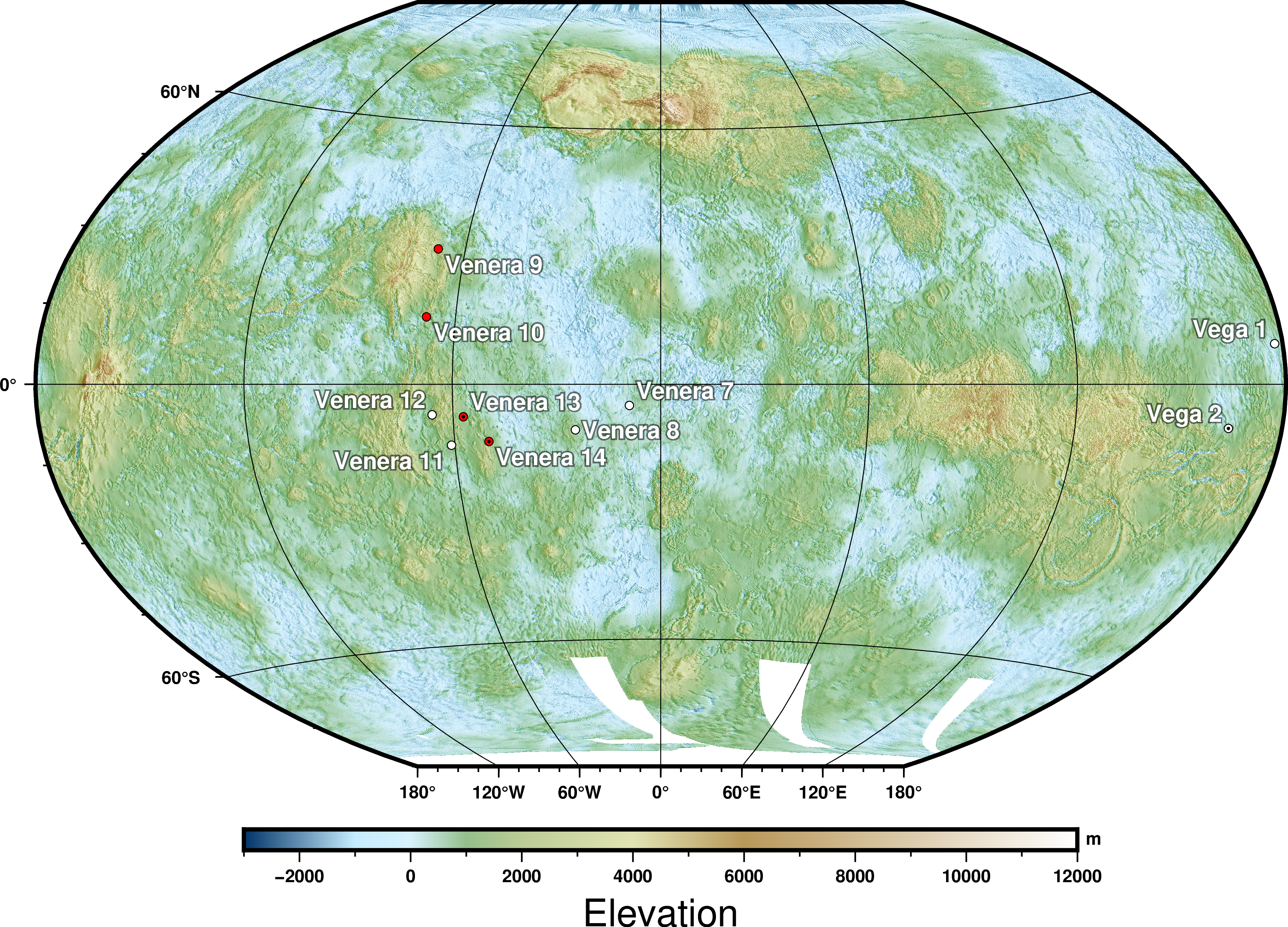
Position of Venera landing sites. Red points denote sites returning images from the surface, black central dots sites of surface sample analysis. Map based on mapping from Pioneer Venus Orbiter and Magellan.

The Venera program (Russian: Вене́ра, pronounced [vʲɪˈnʲɛrə] 'Venus') was a series of space probes developed by the Soviet Union between 1961 and 1984 to gather information about the planet Venus. A total of eighteen probes were sent, including two related Vega probes.

Thirteen probes successfully entered the Venusian atmosphere, including the two Venera-Halley probes. Ten of those successfully landed on the surface of the planet. Due to the extreme conditions, the probes could only survive for a short period on the surface, from 23 minutes to two hours.

The Venera program established a number of precedents in space exploration, among them being the first man-made devices to enter the atmosphere of another planet (Venera 3 on 1 March 1966), the first to make a soft landing on another planet (Venera 7 on 15 December 1970), the first to return images from another planet's surface (Venera 9 on 8 June 1975), the first to record sounds on another planet (Venera 13 on 30 October 1981), and the first to perform high-resolution radar mapping scans (Venera 15 on 2 June 1983). The intense pressures that led to the short lifespans of many of the probes was itself an important finding.

== The Venera probes ==
=== Venera 1 and 2 ===
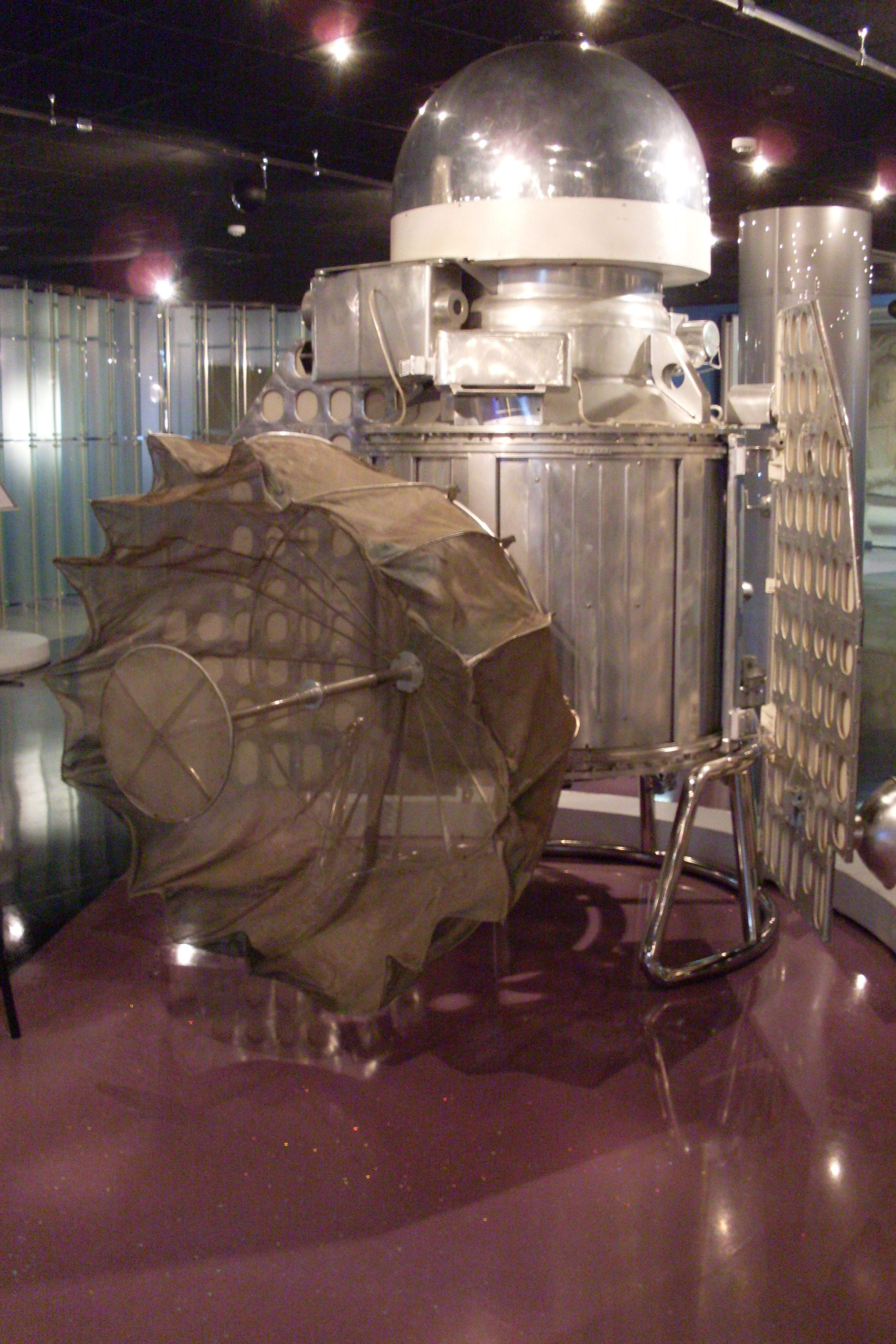
Full-scale model of the Venera 1 in the Memorial Museum of Cosmonautics

The first Soviet attempt at a flyby probe to Venus was launched on 4 February 1961, but failed to leave Earth orbit. In keeping with the Soviet policy at that time of not announcing details of failed missions, the launch was announced under the name Tyazhely Sputnik ("Heavy Satellite"). It is also known as Venera 1VA. As with some of the Soviet Union's other planetary probes, the later versions were launched in pairs, with a second vehicle launched soon after the first.

Venera 1 and Venera 2 were intended to fly past Venus without entering orbit. Venera 1 was launched on 12 February 1961. Telemetry on the probe failed seven days after launch. It is believed to have passed within 100,000 km (62,000 mi) of Venus and remains in heliocentric orbit. Venera 2 launched on 12 November 1965, but also suffered a telemetry failure after leaving Earth orbit. Several other failed attempts at Venus flyby probes were launched by the Soviet Union in the early 1960s, but were not announced as planetary missions at the time, and hence did not officially receive the "Venera" designation.

=== Venera 3 to 6 ===
The Venera 3 to 6 probes were similar in construction. Weighing approximately one ton, and launched by the Molniya-type booster rocket, they included a cruise "bus" and a spherical atmospheric entry probe. The probes were optimised for atmospheric measurements, but not equipped with any special landing apparatus. Although it was hoped they would reach the surface still functioning, the first probes failed almost immediately, thereby disabling data transmission to Earth.

Venera 3 became the first human-made object to impact another planet's surface as it crash-landed on 1 March 1966. However, as the spacecraft's data probes had failed upon atmospheric penetration, no data from within the Venusian atmosphere were retrieved from the mission.

On 18 October 1967, Venera 4 became the first spacecraft to measure the atmosphere of another planet. This spacecraft first showed the major gas of Venus's atmosphere to be CO_{2}. While the Soviet Union initially claimed the craft reached the surface intact, re-analysis, including atmospheric occultation data from the American Mariner 5 spacecraft that flew by Venus the day after its arrival, demonstrated that Venus's surface pressure was 75–100 atmospheres, much higher than Venera 4's 25 atm hull strength, and the claim was retracted.

Realizing the ships would be crushed before reaching the surface, the Soviets launched Venera 5 and Venera 6 as atmospheric probes. Designed to jettison nearly half their payload prior to entering the planet's atmosphere, these craft recorded 53 and 51 minutes of data, respectively, while slowly descending by parachute before their batteries failed. This represented a significant scientific accomplishment. It had become increasingly clear that Venus was unlikely to have liquid bodies of water but designs for the Soviet Venera probes still considered the possibility of a water landing as late as 1964.

=== Venera 7 ===
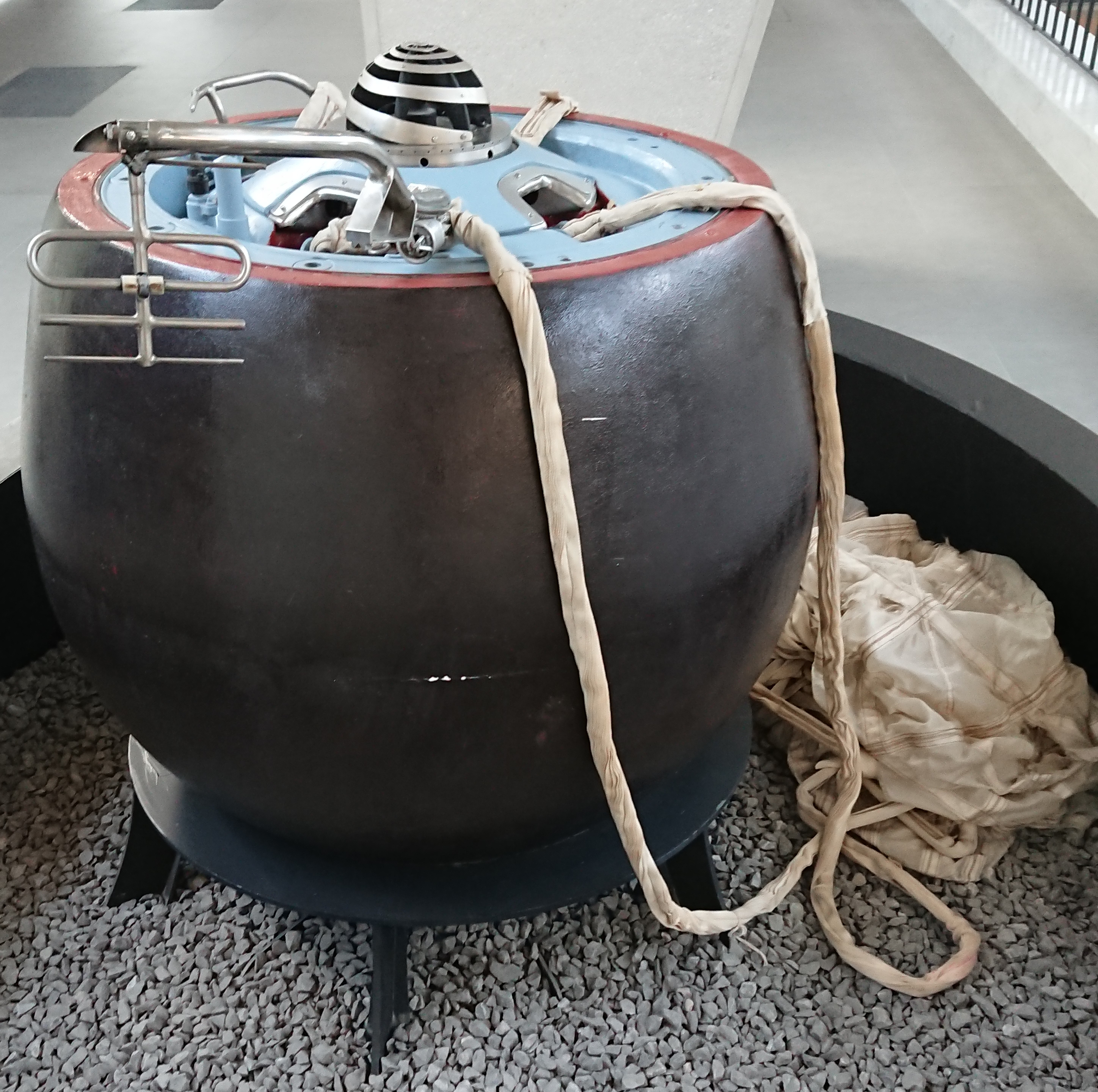
Model of Venera 7 lander in the Cosmos Pavilion, VDNKh

The Venera 7 probe, launched in August 1970, was the first one designed to survive Venus's surface conditions and to make a soft landing. Massively overbuilt to ensure survival, it had few experiments on board, and scientific output from the mission was further limited due to an internal switchboard failure that stuck in the "transmit temperature" position. Still, the control scientists succeeded in extrapolating the pressure (90 atm) from the temperature data with 465 °C (869 °F), which resulted from the first direct surface measurements. The Doppler measurements of the Venera 4 to 7 probes were the first evidence of the existence of zonal winds with high speeds of up to 100 metres per second (220 mph) in the Venusian atmosphere (super rotation). Along with the pressure and temperature data acquired Venera 7 also measured atmospheric composition.

Venera 7's parachute failed shortly before landing very close to the surface. It impacted at 17 metres per second (56 ft/s) and toppled over, but survived. This caused antenna misalignment making the radio signal very weak, but it was detected (with temperature telemetry) for 23 more minutes before its batteries expired. Thus, it became, on 15 December 1970, the first human-made probe to transmit data from the surface of Venus.

=== Venera 8 ===
Venera 8, launched in 1972, was equipped with an extended set of scientific instruments for studying the surface (gamma-spectrometer etc.). The cruise bus of Venera 7 and 8 was similar to that of earlier ones, with the design ascending to the Zond 3 mission. The lander transmitted data during the descent and landed in sunlight. It measured the light level but had no camera. It transmitted data for almost an hour.

=== Venera 9 to 12 ===
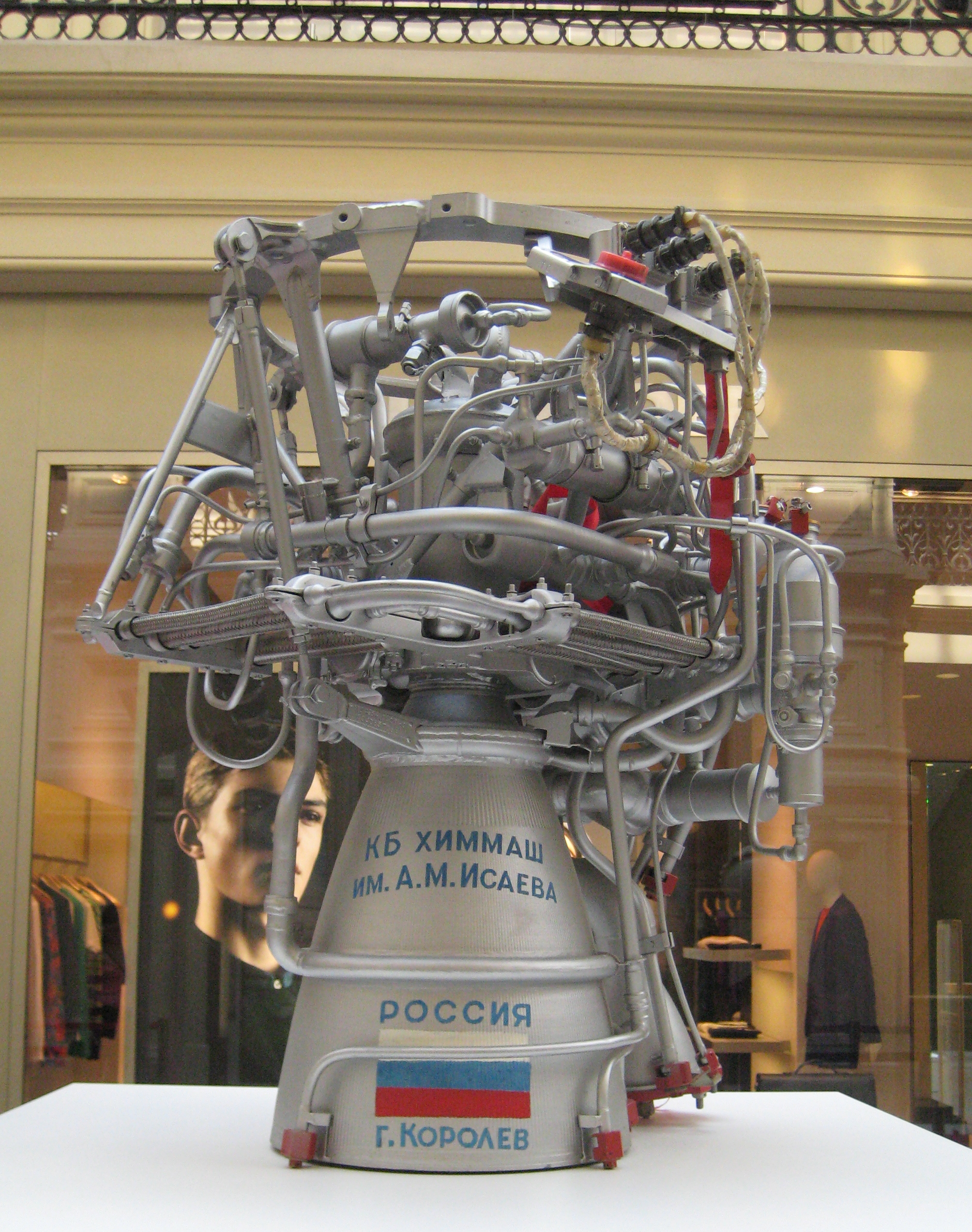
KTDU-425A liquid-propellant engine used on Venera spacecraft from 9 to 16

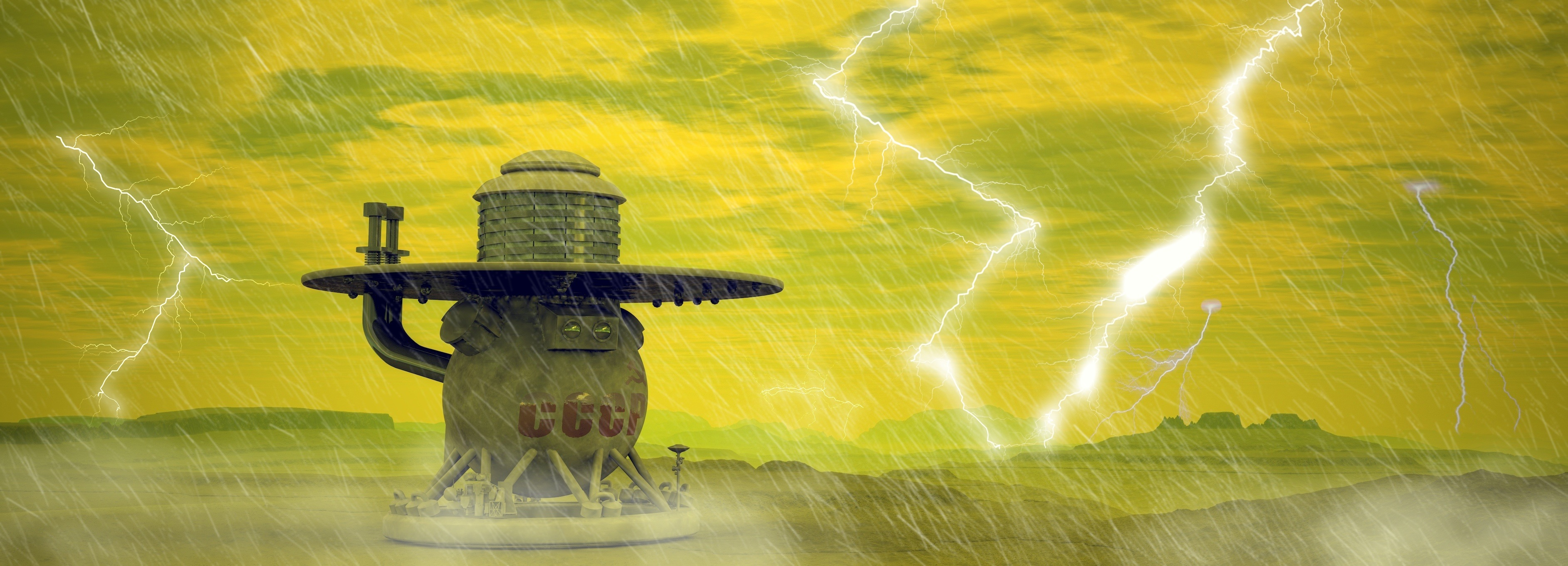
Artist's impression of Venera 10 lander on Venus's surface

Following the failed Kosmos 482, the 1975 Venera 9 and 10 probes and 1978 Venera 11 and 12 probes were of a different design. They weighed approximately five tons and were launched by the powerful Proton booster. They included a transfer and relay bus that had engines to brake into Venus orbit and to serve as receiver and relay for the entry probe's transmissions. The entry probe was attached to the top of the bus in a spherical heat shield. The probes were optimized for surface operations with an unusual design that included a spherical compartment to protect the electronics from atmospheric pressure and heat for as long as possible. Beneath this was a shock-absorbing "crush ring" for landing. Above the pressure sphere was a cylindrical antenna structure and a wide, dish-shaped structure that resembled an antenna but was actually an aerobrake. They were designed to operate on the surface for a minimum of 30 minutes. Instruments varied on different missions, but included cameras and atmospheric and soil analysis equipment. All four landers had problems with some or all of their camera lens caps not releasing.

The Venera 9 lander operated for at least 53 minutes and took pictures with one of two cameras; the other lens cap did not release. These were the first pictures ever taken on the surface of another planet.

The Venera 10 lander operated for at least 65 minutes and took pictures with one of two cameras; the other lens cap did not release.

The Venera 11 lander operated for at least 95 minutes but neither camera's lens cap released.

The Venera 12 lander operated for at least 110 minutes but neither camera's lens cap released.

=== Venera 13 and 14 ===
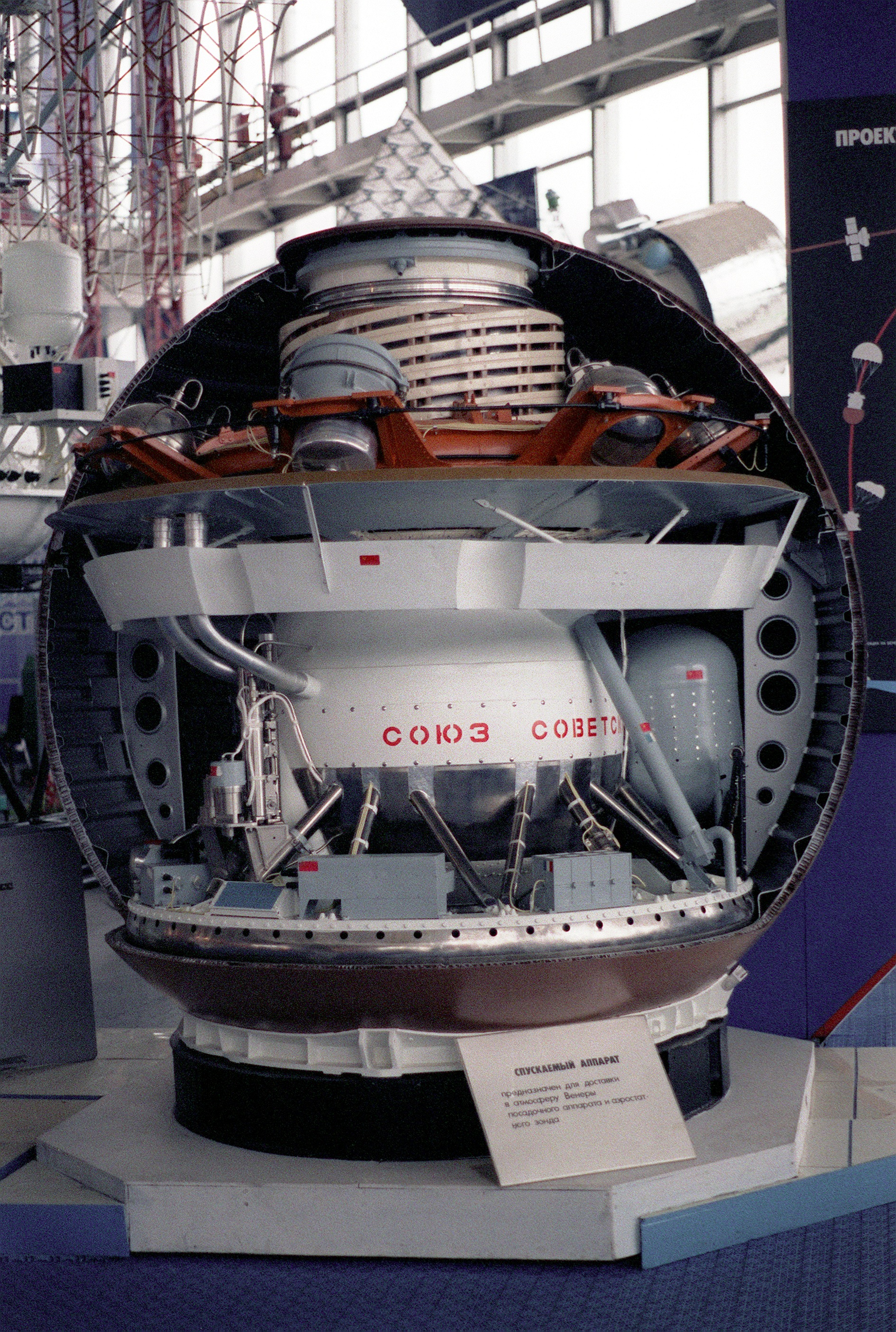
Model of a Venera lander

Venera 13 and 14 (1981–82) each had a descent craft/lander that contained most of the instrumentation and electronics, and a flyby spacecraft that was used as a communications relay. The design was similar to the earlier Venera 9–12 landers. They carried instruments to take scientific measurements of the ground and atmosphere once landed, including cameras, a microphone, a drill and surface sampler, and a seismometer. They also had instruments to record electric discharges during its descent phase through the Venusian atmosphere.

The two descent craft landed about 950 km (590 mi) apart, just east of the eastern extension of an elevated region known as Phoebe Regio. The Venera 13 lander survived for 127 minutes, and the Venera 14 lander for 57 minutes, where the planned design life was only 32 minutes. The Venera 14 craft had the misfortune of ejecting the camera lens cap directly under the surface compressibility tester arm, and returned information for the compressibility of the lens cap rather than the surface. The descent vehicles transmitted data to the buses, which acted as data relays as they flew by Venus.

=== Venera 15 and 16 ===
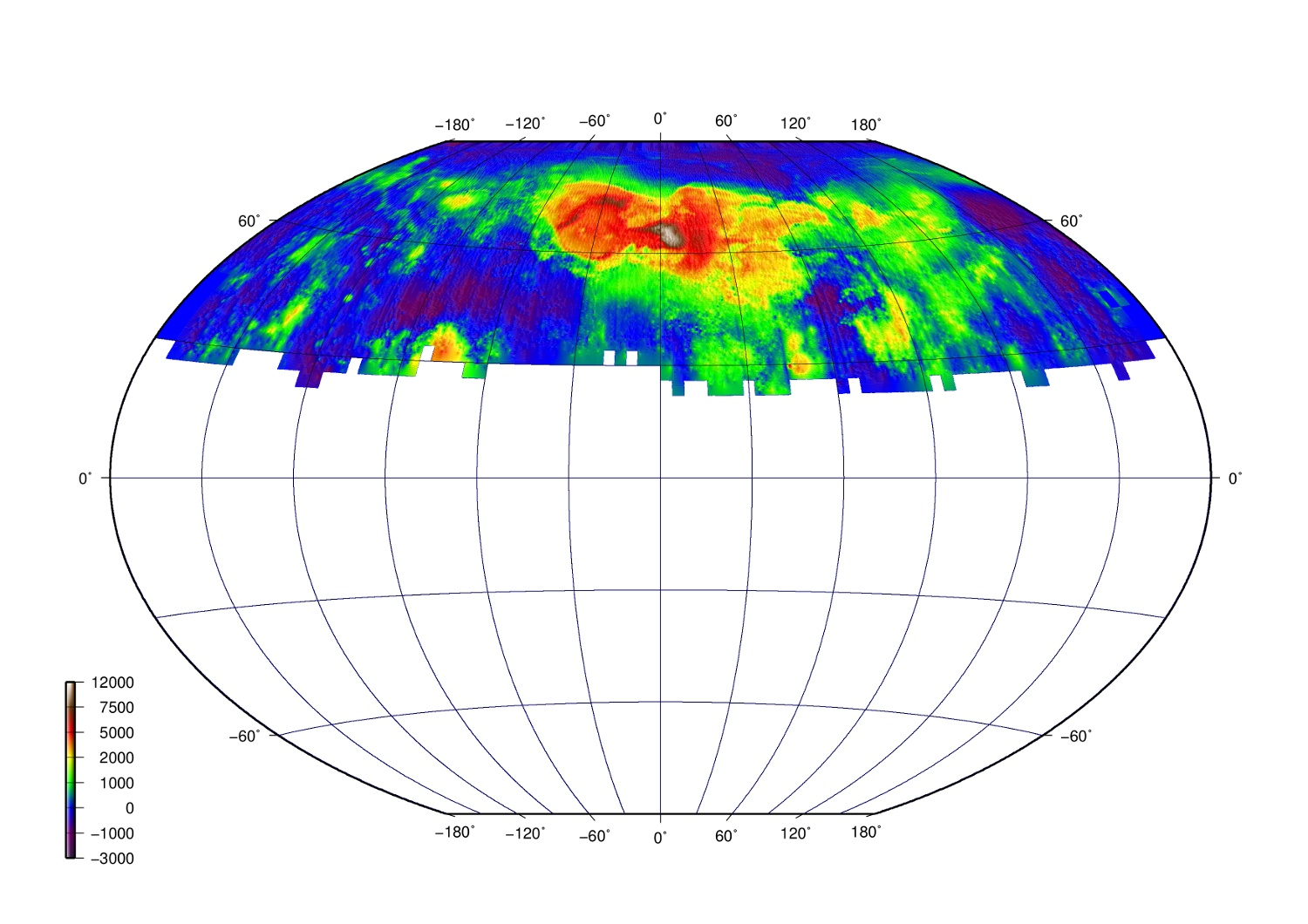
Radar topography obtained by Venera 15/16

The 1983 Venera 15 and 16 spacecraft were orbiter missions, similar to previous probes, but the entry probes were replaced with surface imaging radar equipment. Radar imaging was necessary to penetrate the dense cloud of Venus and both missions included identical synthetic aperture radar (SAR) and radio altimeter systems. The SAR system was crucial in the mapping efforts of the mission and featured an 8-month operational tour to capture Venus's surface at a resolution of 1 to 2 kilometers (0.6 to 1.2 miles). When the system was switched to radio altimeter mode the antenna operated at an 8-centimeter wavelength band to send and receive signals off of the Venusian surface over a period of 0.67 milliseconds.

The results were a detailed map of the reflectivity distribution over the surface of the Venusian Northern Hemisphere. The linear distance measurements that were taken ranged from 91 to 182 kilometers. The twin Soviet spacecraft flew in near-polar elliptical orbits and succeeded in mapping the top half of the northern atmosphere (from the north pole to 30 degrees N latitude, about 115 million square kilometers or 71 million square miles) by the end of the main mission. An altimeter provided topographical data with a height resolution of 50 m (164 feet), and an East German instrument mapped surface temperature variations.

=== VeGa probes ===
The VeGa (Cyrillic: ВеГа) probes to Venus and comet 1/P Halley launched in 1984 also used this basic Venera design, including landers but also atmospheric balloons which relayed data for about two days. "VeGa" is a portmanteau of the words "Venera" (Venus in Russian) and "Gallei" (Halley in Russian).

== Future ==
=== Venera-D ===
Venera-D is a proposed mission to Venus that would include a highly capable orbiter and a lander. From the standpoint of total mass delivered to Venus, the best launch opportunities occur in 2026 and 2031; however, as of March 2021, Venera-D is planned for launch no earlier than November 2029. Venera-D could incorporate some NASA components, including balloons, a subsatellite for plasma measurements, or a long-lived (24 hours) surface station on the lander.

== Scientific findings ==
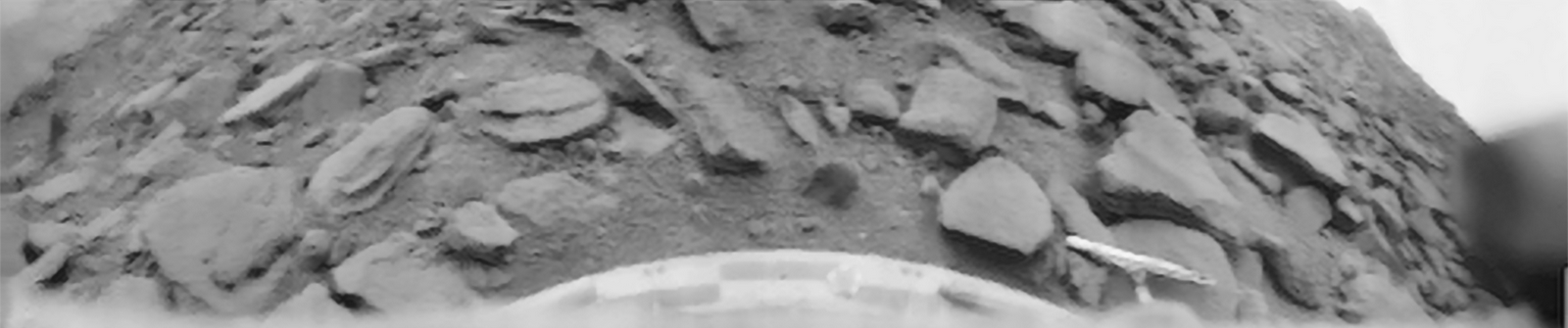
First view of Venus's surface or any other planet other than Earth. The first clear panoramic image taken by Venera 9 lander. This image was sent back in the lander's 53-minute lifetime 22 October 1975. Although it was intended to be a 360-degree image, the second camera's lens cap did not open resulting in this 180-degree panorama.

There were many scientific findings from the data retrieved by the Venera probes making them pivotal in our understanding of Venus. The Venera probes provided direct data regarding Venus's surface and atmosphere while also providing important information on electronics lifetime under Venus's harsh conditions. Venera 4 was the first successful probe, and showed that CO_{2} is the main component in Venus's atmosphere. Venera 7 found the temperature and pressure data as well as the atmospheric composition. Venera 8 measured the K, U, and Th on the surface through gamma-ray analysis. Venera 9 provided the first images of the surface of Venus as well as more gamma-ray analysis. By sending the first images of Venus's surface back to Earth the Venera missions provided scientists with the ability to relay the achievements with the public. Venera 13 provided the first color images and X-ray fluorescence data of the surface of the planet. After analyzing the radar images returned from Venera 15 and 16, it was concluded that the ridges and grooves on the surface of Venus were the result of tectonic deformations. This was found by radar imaging while in orbit. Even with their short lifetimes, the Venera missions each added significant understanding of our sister planet.

== Types of Venera probes ==
Venera program probe types
Model	Type	First Launch	Last Launch	Missions (success/ total)	Launch Vehicle	Mass	Equipment
1VA	Impact	4 Feb 1961	12 Feb 1961	0 / 2	Molniya	643.5 kg (1,419 lb)	5 scientific instruments
2MV-1	Flyby and atmospheric probe	25 Aug 1962	1 Sep 1962	0 / 2	Molniya	1,097 kg (2,418 lb)	11 scientific instruments
2MV-2	Flyby	12 Sep 1962	12 Sep 1962	0 / 1	Molniya	890 kg (1,960 lb)	10 scientific instruments
3MV-1 and 1A	Flyby	19 Feb 1964	2 Apr 1964	0 / 3	Molniya	948 kg (2,090 lb) and 800 kg (1,800 lb) (1A)	10 scientific instruments
3MV-4	Flyby	12 Nov 1965	23 Nov 1965	0 / 2	Molniya-M	963 kg (2,123 lb)	11 scientific instruments
3MV-3	Atmospheric probe and lander	16 Nov 1965	16 Nov 1965	0 / 1	Molniya-M	958 kg (2,112 lb)	10 scientific instruments
1V	Atmospheric probe and lander	12 Jun 1967	17 Jun 1967	1 / 2	Molniya-M	1,106 kg (2,438 lb)	8 scientific instruments
2V	Atmospheric probe and lander	5 Jan 1969	10 Jan 1969	2 / 2	Molniya-M	1,130 kg (2,490 lb)	8 scientific instruments
3V	Atmospheric probe and lander	17 Aug 1970	31 Mar 1972	2 / 4	Molniya-M	1,180 kg (2,600 lb)	5 or 9 scientific instruments
4V-1 and 1M	Orbiter and lander	22 Oct 1975	4 Nov 1981	6 / 6	Proton-K	4,363 kg (9,619 lb); 5,033 kg (11,096 lb)	16 and 21 scientific instruments
4V-2	Orbiter	2 Jun 1983	7 Jun 1983	2 / 2	Proton-K	5,250 kg (11,570 lb); 5,300 kg (11,700 lb)	7 scientific instruments with radar

== Flight data for all Venera missions ==
Name	Model	Mission	Launch	Arrival	Survival time min	Results	Image	Lander coordin.
Venera 1VA No. 1	1VA No. 1	Impactor	4 February 1961	—N/a	—N/a	Failed to leave earth orbit		—N/a
Venera 1	1VA No. 2	Impactor	12 February 1961	—N/a	—N/a	Communications lost en route to Venus		—N/a
Venera 2MV-1 No.1	2MV-1 No.1	Atmospheric probe	25 August 1962	—N/a	—N/a	Escape stage failed; Re-entered three days later		—N/a
Venera 2MV-1 No.2	2MV-1 No.2	Atmospheric probe	1 September 1962	—N/a	—N/a	Escape stage failed; Re-entered five days later		—N/a
Venera 2MV-2 No.1	2MV-2 No.1	Flyby	12 September 1962	—N/a	—N/a	Third stage exploded; Spacecraft destroyed		—N/a
Venera 3MV-1 No.2	3MV-1 No.2	Flyby	19 February 1964	—N/a	—N/a	Did not reach parking orbit		—N/a
Kosmos 27	3MV-1 No.3	Flyby	27 March 1964	—N/a	—N/a	Escape stage failed		—N/a
Venera 2	3MV-4 No.4	Flyby	12 November 1965	—N/a	—N/a	Communications lost just before arrival		—N/a
Venera 3	3MV-3 No.1	Atmospheric probe	16 November 1965	—N/a	—N/a	Communications lost just before atmospheric entry. This was the first manmade object to land on another planet on 1 March 1966 (crash). Probable landing region: -20° to 20° N, 60° to 80° E.		—N/a
Kosmos 96	3MV-4 No.6	Atmospheric probe	23 November 1965	—N/a	—N/a	Failed to leave Earth orbit and reentered the atmosphere. Believed by some researchers to have crashed near Kecksburg, Pennsylvania, USA on 9 December 1965, an event which became known as the "Kecksburg Incident" among UFO researchers. All Soviet spacecraft that never left Earth orbit were customarily renamed "Kosmos", regardless of the craft's intended mission. The name is also given to other Soviet/Russian spacecraft that are intended to—and do reach Earth orbit.		—N/a
Venera 4	4V-1 No.310	Atmospheric probe	12 June 1967	18 October 1967	—N/a	The first probe to enter another planet's atmosphere and return data. Although it did not transmit from the surface, this was the first interplanetary transmission of any probe. Landed somewhere near latitude 19° N, longitude 38° E.		—N/a
Kosmos 167	4V-1 No.311	Atmospheric probe	17 June 1967	—N/a	—N/a	Escape stage failed; Re-entered eight days later		—N/a
Venera 5	2V (V-69) No. 330	Atmospheric probe	5 January 1969	16 May 1969	53*	Successfully returned atmospheric data before being crushed by pressure within 26 kilometres (16 mi) of the surface. Landed at 3° S, 18° E.		—N/a
Venera 6	2V (V-69) No.331	Atmospheric probe	10 January 1969	17 May 1969	51*	Successfully returned atmospheric data before being crushed by pressure within 11 kilometres (6.8 mi) of the surface. Landed at 5° S, 23° E.		—N/a
Venera 7	4V-1 No. 630	Lander	17 August 1970	15 December 1970	23	The first successful landing of a spacecraft on another planet, and the first transmission from another planet's surface. Survived for 23 minutes before succumbing to heat and pressure.		5°S 351°E
Kosmos 359	3V (V-70)	Lander	22 August 1970	—N/a	—N/a	Escape stage failed; Ended up in an elliptical Earth orbit	—N/a	—N/a
Venera 8	4V-1 No.670	Lander	27 March 1972	22 July 1972	50	Landed within a 150-kilometre (93 mi) radius of 10.70° S, 335.25° E.		10°S 335°E
Kosmos 482	3V (V-72) no. 671	Probe	31 March 1972	—N/a	—N/a	Escape stage exploded during Trans-Venus injection; Some pieces re-entered and others remained in Earth orbit, until May 2025 where it re-entered the Earth's atmosphere	—N/a	—N/a
Venera 9	4V-1 No. 660	Orbiter and Lander	8 June 1975	22 October 1975	53	Sent back the first (black and white) images of Venus's surface. Landed within a 150-kilometre (93 mi) radius of 31.01° N, 291.64° E.		31°N 291°E
Venera 10	4V-1 No. 661	Orbiter and Lander	14 June 1975	25 October 1975	65	Landed within a 150-kilometre (93 mi) radius of 15.42° N, 291.51° E.		15°42′N 291°51′E
Venera 11	4V-1 No. 360	Flyby and Lander	9 September 1978	25 December 1978	95	The lander arrived, but the imaging systems failed.		14°S 299°E
Venera 12	4V-1	Flyby and Lander	14 September 1978	21 December 1978	110	The lander recorded what is thought to be lightning.		07°S 294°E
Venera 13	4V-1 no.760	Flyby and Lander	30 October 1981	1 March 1982	127	Returned the first colour images of Venus's surface, and discovered leucite basalt in a soil sample using a spectrometer.		07°05′S 303°00′E
Venera 14	4V-1 No. 761	Flyby and Lander	4 November 1981	5 March 1982	57	A soil sample revealed tholeiitic basalt (similar to that found on Earth's mid-ocean ridges).		13°25′S 310°00′E
Venera 15	4V-2 No. 860	Orbiter	2 June 1983	10 October 1983	—N/a	Mapped (along with Venera 16) the northern hemisphere down to 30 degrees from North (resolution 1–2 km)		—N/a
Venera 16	4V-2	Orbiter	7 June 1983	14 October 1983	—N/a	Mapped (along with Venera 15) the northern hemisphere down to 30 degrees from North (resolution 1–2 km)		—N/a
Vega 1	5VK No. 902	Flyby and Lander	15 December 1984	11 June 1985	—N/a	Part of the Vega program. The vessel was en route to Halley's Comet. During entry into atmosphere, the surface instruments began work early, and the lander failed.		07°05′N 177°07′E
Vega 2	5VK No. 901	Flyby and Lander	21 December 1984	15 June 1985	56	Part of the Vega program. The vessel was en route to Halley's Comet.		08°05′S 177°07′E

== See also ==
- Astron (spacecraft) – Soviet ultraviolet space telescope (1983–1991)
- Pioneer Venus project – Two spacecraft sent to Venus in 1978
- Venera-D – Proposed Russian mission to Venus
- Mariner 10 – First spacecraft to visit Mercury (1973–1975)
- Magellan (spacecraft) – NASA orbiter mission to Venus (1989–1994)
- Venus Express – European orbiter mission to Venus (2005–2015)
