= 3MV =

Soviet unmanned Venus and Mars probe design

- Manufacturer: OKB-1 (Pre 1967); NPO Lavochkin (1967-1972)
- Country of origin: Soviet Union

Specifications
- Launch mass: 800-960kg (Zond/Early Types) 963kg (Venera 2); 960kg (Venera 3); 1106 kg (Venera 4); 1130 kg (Venera 5-6); 1180kg (Venera 7) 1184kg (Venera 8)

Production
- Operational: 1963-1972

Related spacecraft
- Derived from: 2MV

The 3MV planetary probe (short for 3rd generation Mars-Venus) is a designation for a common design used by early Soviet unmanned probes to Mars and Venus. It was an incremental improvement of earlier 2MV probes and was used for Zond 1, Zond 2 and Zond 3 missions to Mars as well as several Venera probes. It was standard practice of the Soviet space program to use standardized components as much as possible. All probes shared the same typical characteristics and differed usually in equipment necessary for specific missions. Each probe also incorporated improvements based on experience with earlier missions.

== Original design (1963-1965) ==
The probe consisted of three primary parts.

=== Orbital Compartment ===
The core of the stack was a pressurized compartment called the Orbital Compartment. This part housed the spacecraft's control electronics, radio transmitters and receivers, batteries, astro-orientation equipment, and so on. The compartment was pressurized to around 100 kPa and thermally controlled to simulate earth-like conditions, which removed the need for special electronic components that could reliably operate in extreme conditions (on Zond 1 the module depressurized in flight, severely damaging the probe's systems).

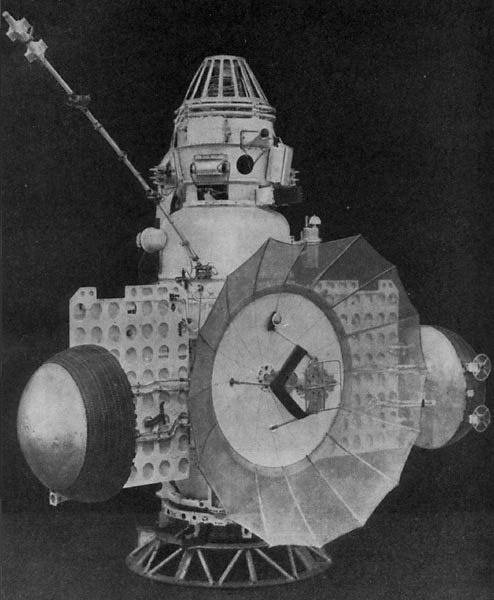
3MV-4A version

Mounted on the outside of the Orbital Compartment were two solar panels which supplied power to the spacecraft. They were folded against the body of the probe during launch and were only deployed when the craft was already on its interplanetary trajectory. On the ends of each solar panel was a hemispherical radiator which radiated excess heat from the orbital compartment into space through a coolant loop.

Also mounted on the Orbital Compartment was a 2 m parabolic high-gain antenna, used for long-range communications. Depending on the mission, the probe also used other antennas (for example, for communication with probes on the planet's surface).

=== Planetary Compartment ===
Below the Orbital Compartment was a second pressurized compartment called the Planetary Compartment. Depending on the mission the Planetary Compartment either housed scientific equipment for orbital observation of the planet or was designed to detach and land on the planet's surface.

=== Engine ===
Course correction capabilities were provided by a KDU-414 engine attached to the top of the Orbital Compartment. It provided a maximum thrust of around 2 kN and used UDMH and nitric acid as propellants. Attitude control was achieved by several small cold gas thrusters.

The whole stack was 3.6 m high and weighted around 1000 kg.

== NPO Lavochkin version (1967-1972) ==
In 1965, a few months before his death, OKB-1 Chief Designer Sergei Korolev switched over the role of Space Probe design and construction to aviation manufacturer NPO Lavochkin. Many changes were made to the 3MV, which began receiving the new designation system used by Lavochkin, the first one being V-67 (Venus 1967). This included the removal of the Radiator spheres on the ends of the solar panels, replaced by the use of antennas as a radiator, increasing the size of the panels. The probe was also heavier than the previous Venera 3. This was due to the change in Soviet thinking of the possible temperature of Venus, with this leading to the V-67 lander being strengthened (although still not strong enough) for the expected harsher environment. It was also equipped with an ablative heat shield.*

After Venera 4's failure to reach the surface of Venus intact, the next 3MV probes (Venera 5 and 6) were strengthened again, this time to withstand a 450-g (compared to the 300-g entry of Venera 4) re-entry due to the 1969 launch window's higher velocity. The V-70 design took this further, with the capsule being slightly more egg-shaped. It was designed to survive 150 atmospheres and 540°C (1004°F). The Parachute was also changed to the heavier weight and the lander was set to −8 °C before detaching from the 3MV bus. Due to these changes, Venera-7 became the first spacecraft to land on Venus, and another planet successfully. The final version of the 3MV bus, the V-72 probes, were launched in early 1972, with one failing to reach Venus (Kosmos 482 which was still orbiting Earth until May 2025). The 3MV was superseded by the newer 4V-1 probes beginning in 1975 with Venera 9 and 10, based on the M-71/73 probes (Mars-2-7).

== Variants ==
- Venera 3MV-1A: Kosmos 21 (3MV-1 No.1), 3MV-1A (failure)
- Venera 3MV-1: Zond 3MV-1 No.2 (failure), Kosmos 27 (3MV-1 No.3), Zond 1 (3MV-1 No.4))
- Mars 3MV-4A: Zond 2 (3MV-4A No.2), Zond 3 (3MV-4A No.3)
- Venera 3MV-4: Venera 2 (3MV-4 No.4), Kosmos 96 (3MV-4 No.6)
- Venera 3MV-3: Venera 3 (3MV-3 No.1), Venera 3MV-3
- Venera 3V (V-67): Venera 4 (V-67 No. 310), Kosmos 159 (V-67 No.311)
- Venera 3V (V-69) Venera 5 (V-69 No. 330), Venera 6 (V-69 No. 331)
- Venera 3V (V-70): Venera 7 (V-70 No.630), Kosmos 359 (V-70 No.631)
- Venera 3V (V-72): Venera 8 (V-72 No.670), Kosmos 482 (V-72 No.671)

== See also ==
- Soviet space program
- Zond program
- Venera
- 2MV
- 4MV
