= Zond 2 =

USSR-era Russian space satellite

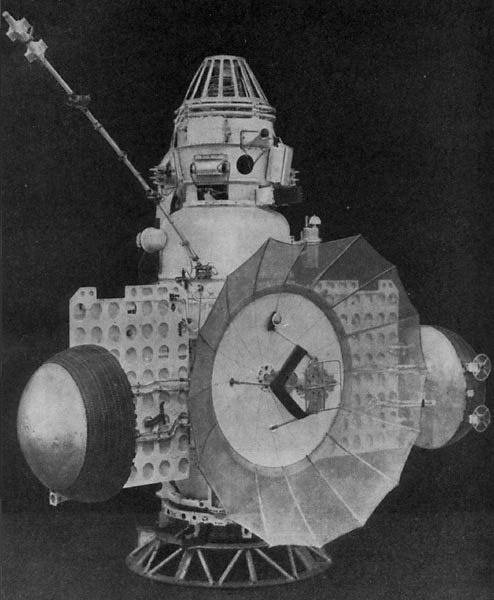
- The Soviet Zond 2.
- Names: Zond 3MV-4 No. 2
- Mission type: Mars flyby
- Operator: OKB-1
- COSPAR ID: 1964-078C
- SATCAT no.: 00945

Spacecraft properties
- Bus: 3MV-4
- Launch mass: 890 kg (1,960 lb)

Start of mission
- Launch date: November 30, 1964, 13:12 UTC
- Rocket: Molniya T103-16
- Launch site: Baikonur LC-1/5

Orbital parameters
- Reference system: Heliocentric
- Eccentricity: 0.216
- Perihelion altitude: 0.98 AU
- Aphelion altitude: 1.52 AU
- Inclination: 6.4°
- Period: 508 days
- Velocity: 5.62 km/s

Flyby of Mars
- Closest approach: August 6, 1965
- Distance: 1,500 km (930 mi)

Zond 2 was a Soviet space probe, a member of the Zond program, and was the sixth Soviet spacecraft to attempt a flyby of Mars. (See Exploration of Mars) It was launched on November 30, 1964 at 13:12 UTC onboard Molniya 8K78 launch vehicle from Baikonur Cosmodrome, Kazakhstan, USSR. The spacecraft was intended to survey Mars but lost communication before arrival.

== History ==
Zond-2 carried a phototelevision camera of the same type later used to photograph the Moon on Zond 3. The camera system also included two ultraviolet spectrometers. As on Mars 1, an infrared spectrometer was installed to search for signs of methane on Mars.

Zond 2 also carried six Pulsed Plasma Thrusters (PPT) that served as actuators of the attitude control system. They were the first PPTs successfully used on a spacecraft. The PPT propulsion system was tested for 70 minutes on the 14 December 1964 when the spacecraft was 4.2 million kilometers from Earth.

Zond 2, a Mars 3MV-4A craft, was launched on November 30, 1964. During some maneuvering in early May 1965, communications were lost. Running on half power due to the loss of one of its solar panels, the spacecraft flew by Mars on August 6, 1965 at 5.62 kilometres per second (3.49 mi/s), 1,500 kilometres (930 mi) away from the planet.

== Scientific Instruments ==
1. Radiation Detector
2. Charged Particle Detector
3. Magnetometer
4. Piezoelectric Detector
5. Radio Telescope
6. Nuclear Component of Cosmic-ray Experiment
7. Ultraviolet and Roentgen Solar Radiation Experiment
8. Imaging System

== See also ==
- List of missions to Mars
- Chronology of Mars Missions

Preceded by Zond 1	Zond program (interplanetary)	Succeeded by Zond 3
