= Kosmos 359 =

Failed Soviet Venus probe

- Mission type: Venus lander
- Operator: Lavochkin
- COSPAR ID: 1970-065A
- SATCAT no.: 4501
- Mission duration: Launch failure

Spacecraft properties
- Spacecraft type: 3MV
- Manufacturer: Lavochkin
- Launch mass: 1,180 kg (2,600 lb)

Start of mission
- Launch date: 22 August 1970, 05:06:09 UTC
- Rocket: Molniya-M 8K78M
- Launch site: Baikonur 31/6
- Contractor: OKB-1

End of mission
- Decay date: 6 November 1970

Orbital parameters
- Reference system: Geocentric
- Regime: Low Earth
- Eccentricity: 0.05041
- Perigee altitude: 210 km (130 mi)
- Apogee altitude: 910 kilometres (570 mi)
- Inclination: 51.50°
- Period: 95.70 minutes

Kosmos 359 was an unmanned Soviet probe launched on 22 August 1970. The probe's intended purpose was to explore Venus, but an error caused the final-stage rocket to malfunction. This left the craft trapped in an elliptical orbit around Earth for 410 days before orbital decay and atmospheric entry. Kosmos 359 was launched five days after Venera 7 and had an identical design; had the craft not suffered a mission-ending failure, it would have landed on Venus shortly after Venera 7. To publicly acknowledge the failure of the attempted Venus lander would be a public relations disaster for the Soviet space program; after the mission failed, the Venera spacecraft was renamed Kosmos 359 in order to conceal the mishap from the public.

== Design ==
The lander was designed to be able to survive atmospheric pressures of up to 180 bars (18,000 kPa) and temperatures of 580 °C (1,076 °F). This was significantly greater than what was expected to be encountered, but significant uncertainties as to the surface temperatures and pressure of Venus resulted in the designers opting for a large margin of error. The degree of hardening added mass to the probe, which limited the amount of mass available for scientific instruments on the probe and the interplanetary bus.

== Rocket malfunction ==
After reaching orbit, the main upper stage engine ignited late and shut down early after running for only twenty-five seconds. The error was ultimately attributed to an error in the DC transformer of the power supply system.

== Experiments ==
Kosmos 359 carried a limited set of scientific instruments, including a solar wind detector, cosmic-ray detector, resistance thermometer, and aneroid barometer.

== See also ==
- List of missions to Venus
