= Kosmos 167 =

Soviet spacecraft

- Mission type: Venus lander
- Operator: GSMZ Lavochkin
- COSPAR ID: 1967-063A
- SATCAT no.: 02852
- Mission duration: 8 days

Spacecraft properties
- Spacecraft type: 4V-1
- Manufacturer: GSMZ Lavochkin
- Launch mass: 1,106 kilograms (2,438 lb)

Start of mission
- Launch date: 17 June 1967, 02:36:38 GMT
- Rocket: Molniya-M 8K78M s/n Ya15000-70
- Launch site: Baikonur, Site 1/5
- Contractor: TsSKB-Progress

End of mission
- Decay date: 25 June 1967

Orbital parameters
- Reference system: Geocentric
- Regime: Low Earth
- Perigee altitude: 187 kilometres (116 mi)
- Apogee altitude: 286 kilometres (178 mi)
- Inclination: 51.8°
- Period: 89.2 minutes
- Epoch: 17 June 1967

Kosmos 167 (Russian: Космос 167 meaning Cosmos 167), or 4V-1 No.311, was a 1967 Soviet spacecraft intended to explore Venus. A spacecraft launched as part of the Venera programme, Kosmos 167 was intended to land on Venus but never departed low Earth orbit due to a launch failure.

Beginning in 1962, the name Kosmos was given to Soviet spacecraft which remained in Earth orbit, regardless of whether that was their intended final destination. The designation of this mission as an intended planetary probe is based on evidence from Soviet and non-Soviet sources and historical documents. Typically, Soviet planetary missions were initially put into an Earth parking orbit as a launch platform with a rocket engine and attached probe. The probes were then launched toward their targets with an engine burn with a duration of roughly 4 minutes. If the engine misfired or the burn was not completed, the probes would be left in Earth orbit and given a Kosmos designation.

== Spacecraft ==
The 4V-1 No.311 spacecraft was the second of two 4V-1 vehicles built and operated by GSMZ Lavochkin, following Venera 4.

== Mission ==
A Molniya-M carrier rocket was used to launch the spacecraft. The launch occurred from Site 1/5 at the Baikonur Cosmodrome at 02:36:38 GMT on 17 June 1967. This mission was intended to be a Venus lander, similar in design to the Venera 4 spacecraft. The spacecraft became stranded in Earth orbit when its Blok VL, fourth stage (trans-interplanetary stage), failed to fire because the engine's turbopump had not been cooled prior to ignition, never departed its parking orbit, and was designated Kosmos 167. The spacecraft reentered on 25 June 1967. It was deployed into a low Earth orbit with a perigee of 187 kilometres (116 mi), an apogee of 286 kilometres (178 mi), an inclination of 51.8° to the equator, and orbital period of 89.2 minutes. It would have received the next designation in the Venera series, at the time Venera 5.

== See also ==
- List of missions to Venus
