= CubeSat UV Experiment =

Space mission concept

CubeSat UV Experiment (CUVE)
- Mission type: Reconnaissance
- Operator: NASA
- Mission duration: Cruise: 1.5 years Science: ≤ 6 months

Spacecraft properties
- Spacecraft: CUVE
- Spacecraft type: CubeSat
- Bus: 12-Units

Venus orbiter

Orbital parameters
- Inclination: 90° (elliptic polar orbit)

Main telescope
- Diameter: 80 mm
- Wavelengths: Ultraviolet - visible (190-570 nm)

Instruments
- UV/Vis spectrometer, broad-spectrum UV imager

CubeSat UV Experiment (CUVE) is a space mission concept to study the atmospheric processes of the planet Venus with a small satellite. Specifically, the orbiter mission would study an enigmatic ultraviolet light absorber of unknown composition situated within the planet's uppermost cloud layer that absorbs about half the solar radiation downwelling in the planet's atmosphere.

The mission concept is still in its early formulation stage. The Principal Investigator is Valeria Cottini, at the University of Maryland in College Park.

== Overview ==
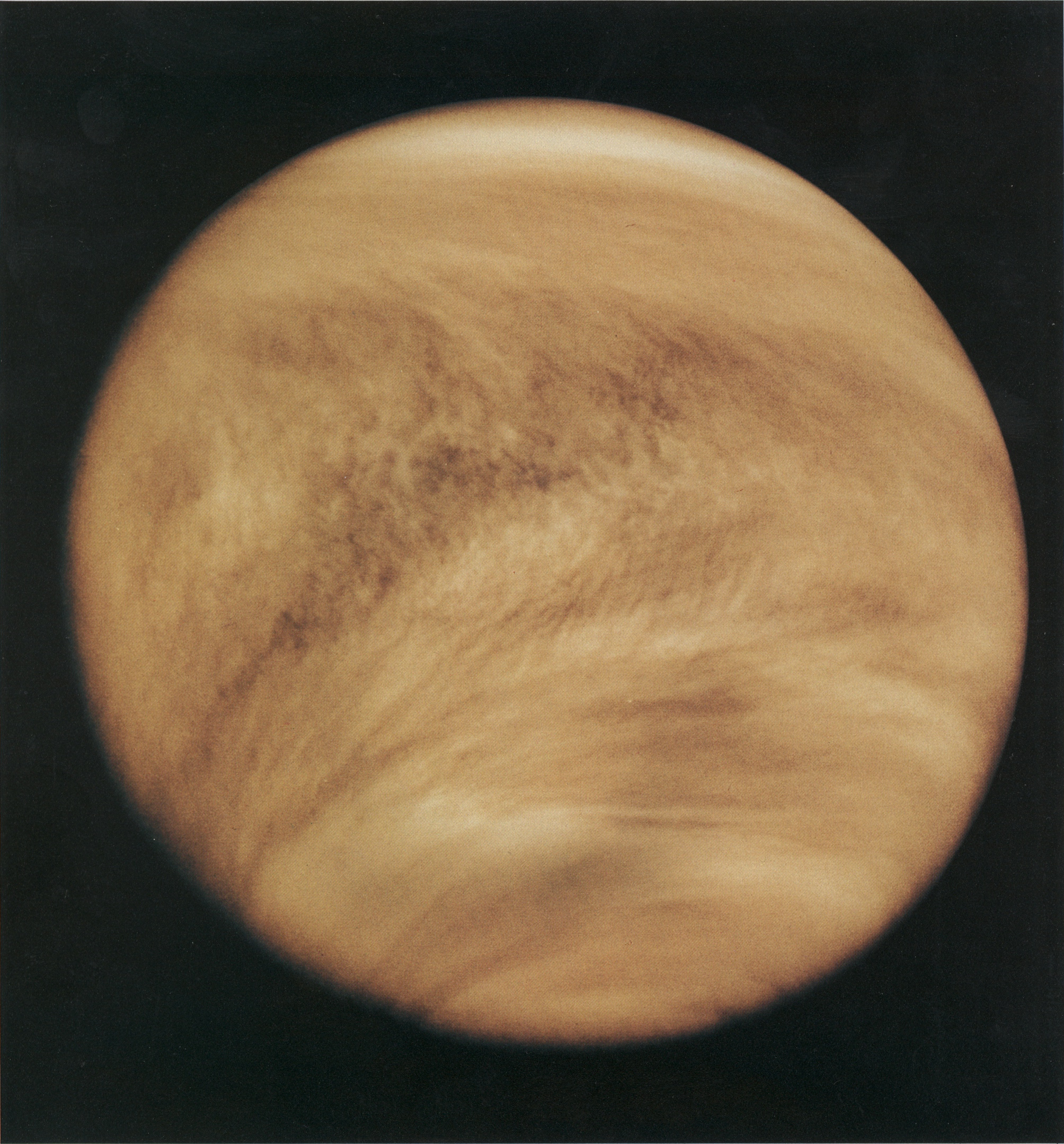
As seen in the ultraviolet, Venus is striped by light and dark areas indicating the abundance of an unknown absorber in the planet's top cloud layer. UV image obtained by the Pioneer Venus Orbiter in 1979

CUVE is a concept mission proposed to NASA that would orbit Venus to measure the ultraviolet light absorption and airglow emissions in order to understand the planet's atmospheric dynamics. CUVE is one of ten proposed missions to study Solar System planets and asteroids, selected by the agency under the Planetary Science Deep Space SmallSat Studies (PSDS3) program, managed by NASA's Science Mission Directorate. The mission was proposed to NASA and it was selected in 2017 for further conceptual development. The team is led by the University of Maryland with collaboration from NASA's Goddard Space Flight Center, the Catholic University of America, and the National Institute for Astrophysics in Italy.

In order to increase launch opportunities CUVE technical requirements are based on reaching Venus as secondary payload of a planetary mission, including missions that are not targeting Venus, or a launch of an Earth-orbiting mission.

=== Science ===
The Venusian upper cloud deck, situated at an altitude range 60–70 km, is formed of small droplets comprising a mix of ~80% sulfuric acid (H_{2}SO_{4}) and water. About half of the solar energy received by Venus is absorbed in the UV by a still unknown absorber situated at the top of the cloud layer. Because of its vast absorbing power, knowing its nature is very important to understand the overall radiative and thermal balance of the planet and the atmospheric dynamics. Although NASA, Roscosmos, the European Space Agency, and Japan's JAXA have dispatched multiple missions to Venus, the nature of the cloud top absorber has not been established.

As of 2018, some candidate chemical species have been proposed to explain the spectral contrast features in the UV: SO_{2}, FeCl_{3}, Cl_{2}, Sn, SCl_{2}, S_{2}O, elemental sulfur, and disulfur dioxide (S_{2}O_{2}). It has also been speculated that any hypothetical microorganisms inhabiting the upper atmosphere, if present, could employ ultraviolet light emitted by the Sun as an energy source, and could cause the observed UV absorption.

== Objectives ==
The primary objective of this mission is to understand the nature, concentration, and distribution of the unidentified UV absorber (peak at 365 nm), and provide clues to identifying its composition and source. It will also study the Venusian atmospheric UV airglow, abundance of trace gases, and cloud-top atmospheric dynamics. The secondary goal is to assess the efficacy of miniaturized instruments in a CubeSat in producing useful scientific measurements in Venus's harsh environment while in proximity to the solar radiation field.

== Spacecraft ==
CUVE would be a 12-unit CubeSat microsatellite with an approximate mass of 180 kg (400 lb).

=== Science payload ===
The small orbiter would carry two science instruments integrated to a small telescope:

- a multi-spectral UV imager (320–570 nm; 4 nm spectral resolution) to add contextual information and capture the contrast features. This UV camera type is a Linear Variable Filter Imager.
- a miniaturized high-resolution ultraviolet spectrometer developed by NASA Goddard to analyze a broad spectral band (190–380 nm; 0.2 nm spectral resolution) covering the ultraviolet and visible regions. The spectrometer is a Low scattering Czerny Turner design.
- a lightweight UV telescope 80 mm in diameter, featuring a novel carbon nanotube light-gathering mirror in an epoxy resin. The mirror, developed by contractor Peter Chen, is extremely light and its fabrication does not require polishing, as it is coated with a reflective material of aluminum and silicon dioxide.

== See also ==
- Atmosphere of Venus
- High Altitude Venus Operational Concept
- List of missions to Venus
- Observations and explorations of Venus
