= Hyperspectral Observer for Venus Reconnaissance =

Proposed Venus orbiter

Hyperspectral Observer for Venus Reconnaissance (HOVER) is a proposed Venus orbiter for remote sensing of its clouds, chemistry, dynamics and surface. The main goal of the mission is research of Venus's climate. The mission is designed by LASP, University of Colorado, SwRI, and the University of Koln.

Main questions the mission would be able to answer are:

1. How do convection and chemistry produce the global clouds?
2. Where and how is solar energy deposited?
3. How is energy transported by largescale circulation?
4. What does Venus climate tell us about past climates?
5. How is Venus current climate impacted by current volcanism?
