= Venera 3 =

Soviet Venus space probe

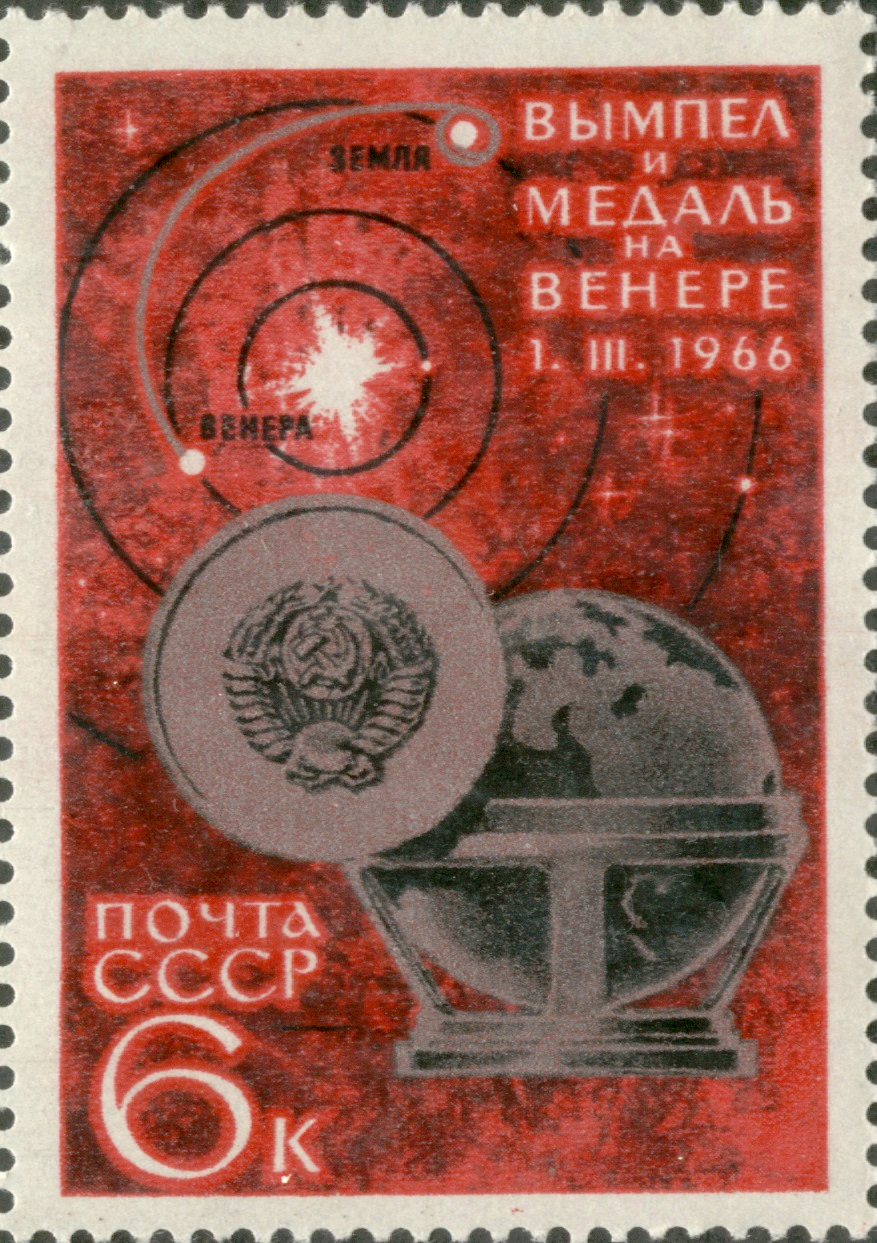
- Mission type: Venus atmospheric probe with flyby spacecraft
- Operator: OKB-1
- COSPAR ID: 1965-092A
- SATCAT no.: 1733
- Mission duration: 105 days

Spacecraft properties
- Spacecraft: 3MV-3 No.1
- Manufacturer: Lavochkin
- Launch mass: 960 kg (2,120 lb)
- Landing mass: 377 kg (831 lb)
- Dimensions: 4.2 m × 1.1 m (13.8 ft × 3.6 ft)

Start of mission
- Launch date: 16 November 1965, 04:19 UTC
- Rocket: Molniya
- Launch site: Baikonur 31/6

Orbital parameters
- Reference system: Heliocentric
- Perihelion altitude: 0.68 AU
- Aphelion altitude: 0.99 AU
- Inclination: 4.29°
- Period: 277 days

Venus impact (failed landing)
- Impact date: 1 March 1966
- Impact site: 20°N 80°E

Venera 3 (Russian: Венера-3 meaning Venus 3) was a Venera program space probe that was built and launched by the Soviet Union to explore the surface of Venus. It was launched on 16 November 1965 at 04:19 UTC from Baikonur, Kazakhstan, USSR. The probe comprised an entry probe, designed to enter the Venus atmosphere and parachute to the surface, and a carrier/flyby spacecraft, which carried the entry probe to Venus and also served as a communications relay for the entry probe.

== History ==
In 1965, the Central Committee, frustrated at the poor track record of Sergei Korolev's OKB-1 design bureau, reassigned the planetary probe program to the Lavochkin bureau. In over two dozen attempts dating back to 1958, Luna 2 and Luna 3 were the only probes to complete all of their mission objectives. In the meantime, the United States had succeeded with the Mariner 2 Venus probe and Mariner 4 Mars probe, and after a long string of lunar probe failures, Ranger 6 successfully impacted on the Moon (with a failed TV system), and Ranger 7 successfully sent back a series of TV pictures.

The Lavochkin bureau began a comprehensive testing program of the Venera and Luna probes, while Korolev had always opposed the idea of bench tests except on crewed spacecraft. Among other design flaws they discovered was that the Venera landers, after being subjected to a centrifuge test, failed at half the G forces that they were supposed to handle.

== Mission ==
The mission of this spacecraft was to land on the Venusian surface. The entry body contained a radio communication system, scientific instruments, electrical power sources, and medallions bearing the Coat of Arms of the Soviet Union.

The probe's initial trajectory missed Venus by 60,550km and a mid-course correction manoeuvre was carried out on 26 December 1965 which brought the probe onto a collision course with the planet. Contact with the probe was lost on 15 February 1966 likely due to overheating of internal components and the solar panels, the same problems that likely caused the loss of Venera 2.

The entry probe crashed on Venus on 1 March 1966, making Venera 3 the first space probe to hit the surface of another planet.

In response to American and British scientists concerns of contamination of Venus, the Soviet press emphasised that the probe was sterilised before launch. This was because very little was known about the conditions on the surface of Venus and many believed it was ideal for harbouring life.

== Instruments ==
=== Power system ===
The power system for the carrier spacecraft was notable in that it was the first operational use of Gallium Arsenide (GaAs) solar cells in space. GaAs solar cells, manufactured by Kvant, were chosen because of their higher performance in high-temperature environments. Two two-square-meter solar panels charged the rechargeable batteries.

The entry probe was battery-powered using non-rechargeable batteries.

=== Interplanetary Bus ===
==== Non-scientific equipment ====
- Transmitters and receivers at UHF frequency;
- Telemetry switches;
- System of alignment and correction station movement: micromotors, gas jets, electro-optical probe position sensors, and gyroscopes;
- Computer controller of all probe systems.

==== Scientific equipment ====
- Three flux-gate magnetometer to measure interplanetary magnetic fields;
- Discharge counters and semiconductor detector for the study of cosmic rays;
- Special sensors (traps) to measure the flow of charged particles and determination of low energy consumption of the amounts of solar plasma flows and their energy spectra;
- Piezoelectric sensors for research micrometeorites;
- Measurement of emissions of cosmic radio in the wavelength intervals of 150 and 1500 meters and to 15 km.

The probe differed from Venera 2 in not having a micrometeorite detector.

=== Lander ===
- Photometer
- Gas Analyzer
- Temperature, pressure and density sensors
- Movement detector
- Gamma Ray Counter

== See also ==
- 1965 in spaceflight
- List of missions to Venus
- Timeline of planetary exploration
