= Molniya (rocket) =

Soviet rocket

Molniya (R-7 8K78)
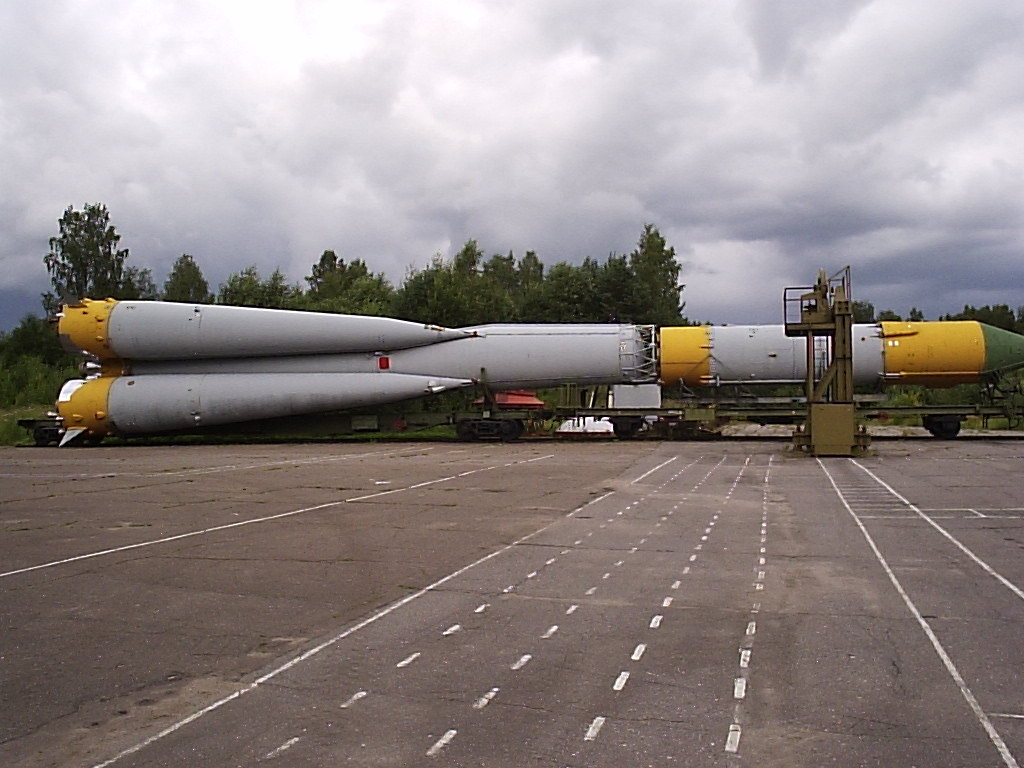
- Molniya-M carrier rocket
- Function: Medium launch vehicle
- Manufacturer: Energia
- Country of origin: Soviet Union

Size
- Height: 43.44 m
- Diameter: 10.3 m
- Mass: 305,000 kg
- Stages: 4

Associated rockets
- Family: R-7

Launch history
- Status: Retired
- Launch sites: Baikonur, Plesetsk
- Total launches: 40
- Success(es): 20
- Failure: 9
- Partial failure: 11

The Molniya (Russian: Молния, meaning "lightning", GRAU: 8K78, Sheldon: A-2-e, DoD: SL-6) was a modification of the well-known R-7 Semyorka rocket and had four stages. The rocket was given the name Molniya due to the large number of Molniya communication satellites the rockets launched.

== History ==
The 8K78 resulted from a crash program by the Korolev Bureau to develop a booster for launching planetary probes. A larger third stage was added along with a fourth stage (Blok L) that was designed to fire in-orbit to send the payload out of LEO (replacing the inaccurate direct ascent of the first generation Luna probes launched on the 8K72) and the core and strap-ons had the new uprated 8D74K first stage engines. The first couple of 8K78s flown used an 8K74 core however vehicles flown in 1962-63 used the older 8K71 core. The 8K74 core returned for vehicles flown in 1964 and later.

The initial 8K78s had a faulty Blok I design that was prone to vibration issues and pump cavitation. The Blok I was redesigned afterward and the improved version was first flown on 11 November 1963. The uprated 8K78M booster was introduced in 1965 but 8K78s continued to fly into 1967. The Molniya also carried early Venera probes to Venus.

Molniya (E6) was a minor revision adapted for Luna E-6 series space probes where the guidance system for the entire launch vehicle was moved to the probe itself.

== Characteristics ==
- Length: 43.440 m
- Diameter: 10.300 m
- Launch mass: 305,000 kg
- Strap-On Boosters: Blok-B,V,G,D / 4 × RD-107
- Stage 1: Blok-A / RD-108K
- Stage 2: Blok-I / RD-0108
- Stage 3: Blok-L / S1.5400

== Launches ==
Molniya rockets were launched 40 times:

Molniya launches
Date	Version	Serial No.	LS	Payload	Result
10.10.1960	Molniya	L1-4M	Baikonur LC-1/5	Mars (1a) (1M #1)	Failure
14.10.1960	Molniya	L1-5M	Baikonur LC-1/5	Mars (1b) (1M #2)	Failure
04.02.1961	Molniya	L1-7V	Baikonur LC-1/5	Venera (1a) (1VA #1, Sputnik 7)	Partial failure
12.02.1961	Molniya	L1-6V	Baikonur LC-1/5	Venera 1 (1VA #2, Sputnik 8)	Success
25.08.1962	Molniya	T103-12	Baikonur LC-1/5	Venera (2a) (2MV-1 #1, Sputnik 19)	Partial failure
01.09.1962	Molniya	T103-13	Baikonur LC-1/5	Venera (2b) (2MV-1 #2, Sputnik 20)	Partial failure
12.09.1962	Molniya	T103-14	Baikonur LC-1/5	Venera (2c) (2MV-2 #1, Sputnik 21)	Partial failure
24.10.1962	Molniya	T103-15	Baikonur LC-1/5	Mars (1c) (2MV-4 #1, Sputnik 22)	Partial failure
01.11.1962	Molniya	T103-16	Baikonur LC-1/5	Mars 1 (2MV-4 #2, Sputnik 23)	Success
04.11.1962	Molniya	T103-17	Baikonur LC-1/5	Mars (2a) (2MV-3 #1, Sputnik 24)	Partial failure
04.01.1963	Molniya (E6)	T103-09	Baikonur LC-1/5	Luna E-6 No.2 Luna (4c) (Ye-6 No.2, Sputnik 25)	Partial failure
03.02.1963	Molniya (E6)	G103-10	Baikonur LC-1/5	Luna E-6 No.3 Luna (4d) (Ye-6 No.3)	Failure
02.04.1963	Molniya (E6)	G103-11	Baikonur LC-1/5	Luna 4 (Ye-6 No.4)	Success
11.11.1963	Molniya	G15000-017	Baikonur LC-1/5	Kosmos 21 (Zond (1a)) (3MV-1A #1)	Partial failure
19.02.1964	Molniya (M)	T15000-019	Baikonur LC-1/5	Zond (1b) (3MV-1A #2)	Failure
21.03.1964	Molniya (E6)	T15000-020	Baikonur LC-1/5	Luna (5a) (Ye-6 No.6)	Failure
27.03.1964	Molniya (M)	T15000-022	Baikonur LC-1/5	Kosmos 27 (Zond (1c)) (3MV-1 #1)	Partial failure
02.04.1964	Molniya (M)	G15000-028 ?	Baikonur LC-1/5	Zond 1 (3MV-1 #2)	Success
20.04.1964	Molniya (E6)	T15000-021	Baikonur LC-1/5	Luna (5b) (Ye-6 No.5)	Failure
04.06.1964	Molniya	G15000-018	Baikonur LC-1/5	Molniya-1 (1a) (Molniya-1 2L)	Failure
22.08.1964	Molniya	G15000-019	Baikonur LC-1/5	Kosmos 41 (Molniya-1 (1b)) (Molniya-1 1L)	Success
30.11.1964	Molniya	G15000-029	Baikonur LC-1/5	Zond 2 (3MV-4 #1)	Success
12.03.1965	Molniya (E6)	G15000-024	Baikonur LC-1/5	Kosmos 60 (Luna (5c)) (Ye-6 No.9)	Partial failure
10.04.1965	Molniya (E6)	U15000-022	Baikonur LC-1/5	Luna (5d) (Ye-6 No.8)	Failure
23.04.1965	Molniya	U15000-035	Baikonur LC-1/5	Molniya-1 1 (Molniya-1 3L)	Success
09.05.1965	Molniya (M)	U15000-024	Baikonur LC-1/5	Luna 5 (Ye-6 No.10)	Success
08.06.1965	Molniya (M)	U15000-033	Baikonur LC-1/5	Luna 6 (Ye-6 No.7)	Success
18.07.1965	Molniya	U15000-032	Baikonur LC-1/5	Zond 3 (3MV-4 #2)	Success
14.10.1965	Molniya	U15000-034	Baikonur LC-1/5	Molniya-1 2 (Molniya-1 4L)	Success
12.11.1965	Molniya (M)	U15000-042	Baikonur LC-31/6	Venera 2 (3MV-4 #3)	Success
16.11.1965	Molniya (M)	U15000-031	Baikonur LC-31/6	Venera 3 (3MV-3 #1)	Success
23.11.1965	Molniya (M)	U15000-030	Baikonur LC-31/6	Kosmos 96 (Venera (4a)) (3MV-4 #4)	Partial failure
03.12.1965	Molniya	U15000-048	Baikonur LC-31/6	Luna 8 (Ye-6 No.12)	Success
27.03.1966	Molniya (M)	U15000-040	Baikonur LC-31/6	Molniya-1 (3) (Molniya-1 5L)	Failure
25.04.1966	Molniya (M)	N15000-037	Baikonur LC-31/6	Molniya-1 3 (Molniya-1 6L)	Success
20.10.1966	Molniya (M)	N15000-040	Baikonur LC-1/5	Molniya-1 4 (Molniya-1 7L)	Success
24.05.1967	Molniya (M)	N15000-041	Baikonur LC-1/5	Molniya-1 5 (Molniya-1 8L)	Success
31.08.1967	Molniya (M)	N15000-081	Baikonur LC-1/5	Kosmos 174 (Molniya-1Yu 11L)	Success
03.10.1967	Molniya (M)	Ya15000-083	Baikonur LC-1/5	Molniya-1 6 (Molniya-1 9L)	Success
22.10.1967	Molniya (M)	Ya15000-084	Baikonur LC-1/5	Molniya-1 7 (Molniya-1 12L)	Success

== See also ==
- R-7 (rocket family)
- Molniya-M
- Soyuz launch vehicle
- Voskhod rocket
- Venera 4V-2
