= Venera 4V-2 =

1983 Soviet spacecraft

Venera 4V-2 (Russian: Венера 4В-2) was a series of two identical spacecraft sent to Venus by the Soviet Union, consisting of Venera 15 and Venera 16. Both uncrewed orbiters were to map the surface of Venus using high resolution imaging systems. The spacecraft were identical and based on modifications to the earlier Venera space probes.

== Mission profile ==
Venera 15 was launched on June 2, 1983, at 02:38:39 UTC, and Venera 16 on June 7, 1983, at 02:32:00 UTC. Venera 15 and Venera 16 both reached Venus' orbit (on October 10, 1983, and October 14, 1983, respectively).

The two spacecraft were inserted into Venus orbit a day apart with their orbital planes shifted by an angle of approximately 4° relative to one another. This made it possible to reimage an area if necessary. Each spacecraft was in a nearly polar orbit with a periapsis ~1000 km, at 62°N latitude, and apoapsis ~65000 km, with an inclination ~90°, the orbital period being ~24 hours.

In June 1984, Venus was at superior conjunction and passed behind the Sun as seen from Earth. No transmissions were possible, so the orbit of Venera 16 was rotated back 20° at this time to map the areas missed during this period.

Together, the two spacecraft imaged the area from the north pole down to about 30°N latitude (i.e. approx. 25% of Venus surface) over the 8 months of mapping operations.

== Spacecraft structure ==
The Venera 15 and 16 spacecraft were identical and were based on modifications to the orbiter portions of the Venera 9 and Venera 14 probes. Each spacecraft consisted of a 5 m-long (16 ft) cylinder with a 0.6 m-diameter (2.0 ft), 1.4 m-tall (4.6 ft) parabolic dish antenna for the synthetic aperture radar (SAR) at one end. A 1-meter-diameter (3.3 ft) parabolic dish antenna for the radio altimeter was also located at this end. The electrical axis of the radio altimeter antenna was lined up with the axis of the cylinder. The electrical axis of the SAR deviated from the spacecraft axis by 10 degrees. During imaging, the radio altimeter would be lined up with the center of the planet (local vertical) and the SAR would be looking off to the side at 10 degrees. A bulge at the opposite end of the cylinder held fuel tanks and propulsion units. Two square solar arrays extended like wings from the sides of the cylinder. A 2.6 m radio dish antenna for communications was also attached to the side of the cylinder. The spacecraft each massed 4,000 kg (4.4 short tons).

Both Venera 15 and 16 were equipped with a Synthetic Aperture Radar (SAR). A radar was necessary in this mission because nothing else would be able to penetrate the dense clouds of Venus. The probes were equipped with onboard computers that saved the images until the entire image was complete.

== See also ==
- Venera 15
- Venera 16
