= Zond 3MV-1 No.2 =

Failed Soviet Venus spacecraft

- Mission type: Venus flyby
- Operator: OKB-1
- COSPAR ID: 1964-F01
- SATCAT no.: 00277
- Mission duration: Launch failure

Spacecraft properties
- Spacecraft type: 3MV-1
- Manufacturer: Lavochkin
- Launch mass: 800 kg (1,800 lb)

Start of mission
- Launch date: 19 February 1964, 05:47:40 UTC
- Rocket: Molniya 8K78M s/n T15000-19
- Launch site: Baikonur 1/5

Zond 3MV-1 No.2 (or Zond 3MV-1A No. 4A), also known as Venera 1964A in the West, was a Soviet spacecraft, which was launched in 1964 as part of the Zond program. Due to a problem with its carrier rocket third stage, it failed to reach low Earth orbit.

== Launch ==
Zond 3MV-1 No.2 was launched at 05:47:40 UTC on 19 February 1964, atop a Molniya 8K78M carrier rocket flying from Site 1/5 at the Baikonur Cosmodrome. The launch started nominally, however, the third stage failed. A subsequent investigation concluded that an unpressurised valve (B4311-O) allowed LOX (liquid oxygen) to leak and come in contact with the RP-1 propellant while the rocket was still on the launchpad. This caused a pipeline to crack and, as Block I ignition began, an explosion destroyed the thrust section.

The remains of the stage and probe landed 52 miles (85 kilometers) north of the town of Barabinsk in Siberia.

Western radar apparently detected the launch attempt, however, it was misidentified as a failed lunar probe in public sources.

== Scientific Instruments ==
The spacecraft bus included several scientific instruments:

- Radiation detector
- Charged particle detector
- Magnetometer
- Piezoelectric detector
- LA-2 atomic hydrogen detector
- Kassoipeya radio telescope
- RSK-2M ultraviolet and Roentgen solar radiation experiment
- VIKT-2 technology experiment
- Plasma engines

== See also ==
- List of missions to Venus
- Zond failed missions
