= Kosmos 27 =

Failed Soviet Venus impact probe

- Mission type: Venus impact probe
- Operator: OKB-1
- COSPAR ID: 1964-014A
- SATCAT no.: 00770

Spacecraft properties
- Spacecraft type: 3MV-1
- Manufacturer: OKB-1
- Launch mass: 6520 kg
- Dry mass: 948 kg (including an impact probe of 285 kg)

Start of mission
- Launch date: 27 March 1964, 03:24:43 GMT
- Rocket: Molniya 8K78 s/n T15000-22
- Launch site: Baikonur, Site 1/5
- Contractor: OKB-1

End of mission
- Decay date: 28 March 1964

Orbital parameters
- Reference system: Geocentric
- Regime: Low Earth
- Perigee altitude: 167 km
- Apogee altitude: 198 km
- Inclination: 64.8°
- Period: 88.7 minutes
- Epoch: 27 March 1964

Kosmos 27 (Russian: Космос 27 meaning Cosmos 27), also known as Zond 3MV-1 No.3 was a space mission intended as a Venus impact probe. The spacecraft was launched by a Molniya 8K78 carrier rocket from Baikonur. The Blok L stage and probe reached Earth orbit successfully, but the attitude control system failed to operate.

== Launch ==
Kosmos 27 was launched at 03:24:43 GMT on 27 March 1964, atop a Molniya 8K78 s/n T15000-22 carrier rocket flying from Site 1/5 at the Baikonur Cosmodrome.

== Spacecraft ==
Kosmos 27 was a "third-generation" deep space planetary probes of the 3MV series of the Soviet Union. The Soviet engineers planned four types of the 3MV, the 3MV-1 (for Venus impact), 3MV-2 (for Venus flyby), 3MV-3 (for Mars impact), and 3MV-4 (for Mars flyby). The primary difference over the second-generation was vastly improved (and in many cases doubled) orientation system elements as well as improved onboard propulsion systems. While these four versions were meant to study Mars and Venus.

== Mission ==
The probe was the first dedicated 3MV spacecraft that the Soviets launched (earlier missions had been of the test "Object-Probe" versions as Kosmos 21). It was designed to accomplish atmospheric entry into Venus followed by descent and impact. On 27 March 1964, it had a perigee of 167 kilometres (104 mi) and an apogee of 198 kilometres (123 mi), with an inclination of 64.8° and an orbital period of 88.7 minutes. The spacecraft successfully reached Earth orbit but failed to leave for Venus when the Blok L upper stage malfunctioned. The upper stage lost stable attitude due to a failure in the circuit of the power supply circuit that powered the valves for the attitude control system; hence, the stage remained uncontrollable and not ready to initiate a burn to leave Earth orbit. The problem was traced to a design error, the examination of telemetry data found that the failure was due to a design flaw in the circuitry of the BOZ unit, which resulted in power not being transferred to the attitude control jets on the Blok L stage, rather than one related to quality control. The spacecraft burned up in Earth's atmosphere the following day, on 28 March 1964. If successful, this mission would have been given a "Venera" designation.

== See also ==
- List of missions to Venus
