= Venera 2 =

Soviet Venus spacecraft

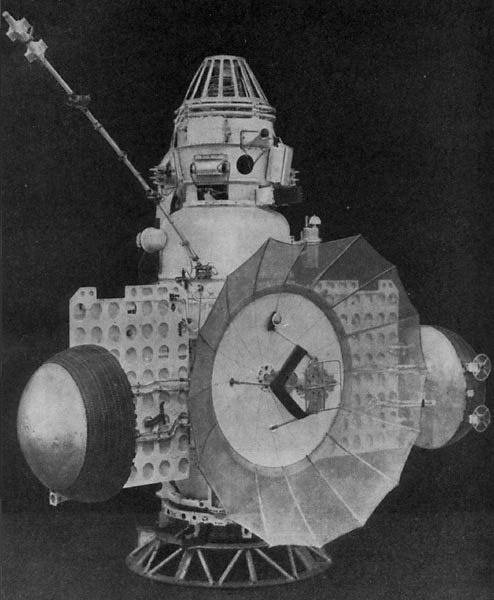
- Mission type: Venus flyby
- Operator: OKB-1
- COSPAR ID: 1965-091A
- SATCAT no.: 1730
- Mission duration: 3 months and 15 days

Spacecraft properties
- Spacecraft: 3MV-4 No.4
- Manufacturer: OKB-1
- Launch mass: 1,037 kg (2,286 lb)

Start of mission
- Launch date: 12 November 1965, 05:02 UTC
- Rocket: Molniya-M
- Launch site: Baikonur 31/6

End of mission
- Disposal: Spacecraft failure
- Declared: 4 March 1966
- Last contact: 27 February 1966; Shortly before flyby

Orbital parameters
- Reference system: Geocentric
- Regime: Low Earth
- Perigee altitude: 205 km (127 mi)
- Apogee altitude: 315 km (196 mi)
- Inclination: 51.8°
- Period: 89.71 minutes

Flyby of Venus
- Closest approach: 27 February 1966, 02:52 UTC
- Distance: 23,810 km (14,790 mi)

Venera 2 (Russian: Венера-2 meaning Venus 2), also known as 3MV-4 No.4 was a Soviet spacecraft intended to explore Venus. A 3MV-4 spacecraft launched as part of the Venera programme, it failed to return data after flying past Venus.

== Mission ==
Venera 2 was launched by a Molniya carrier rocket, flying from Site 31/6 at the Baikonur Cosmodrome. The launch occurred at 05:02 UTC on 12 November 1965, with the first three stages placing the spacecraft and Blok-L upper stage into a low Earth parking orbit before the Blok-L fired to propel Venera 2 into heliocentric orbit bound for Venus, with perihelion of 0.716 AU, aphelion of 1.197 AU, eccentricity of 0.252, inclination of 4.29 degrees and orbital period of 341 days.

The Venera 2 spacecraft was equipped with 8 scientific instruments:

1. Magnetometer ion traps
2. An imaging system (cameras)
3. Solar and cosmic x-ray detectors
4. Cosmic-ray gas-discharge counters
5. Piezoelectric detectors
6. Ion traps
7. Photon Geiger counter
8. Cosmic radio emission receivers

The spacecraft made its closest approach to Venus at 02:52 UTC on 27 February 1966, at a distance of 23,810 km (14,790 mi).

During the flyby, all of Venera 2's instruments were activated, requiring that radio contact with the spacecraft be suspended. The probe was to have stored data using onboard recorders, and then transmitted it to Earth once contact was restored, after the flyby. Following the flyby the spacecraft failed to reestablish communications with the ground. It was declared lost on 4 March 1966. An investigation into the failure determined that the malfunction of the radiator caused an increase in gas temperatures which damaged elements of the receiving and encoding units and the solar panels overheated. Useful scientific data might have been collected but none was transmitted back to Earth.

== Misidentification ==
In March 2025, Abraham Loeb published a paper where he claimed that the asteroid 2005 VL_{1} is the same object as Venera 2, arguing that the asteroid made its closest approach to Earth in November 1965 (around the same time that Venera 2 launched). However, this was quickly disproven by Federico Spada and Jonathan McDowell, where reconstructions of Venera 2's orbital trajectory does not match with that of 2005 VL_{1}, adding that the asteroid itself did not even made a close encounter with Venus in early 1966.

== See also ==
- List of missions to Venus
