= Venera 7 =

Soviet lander mission to Venus (1970)

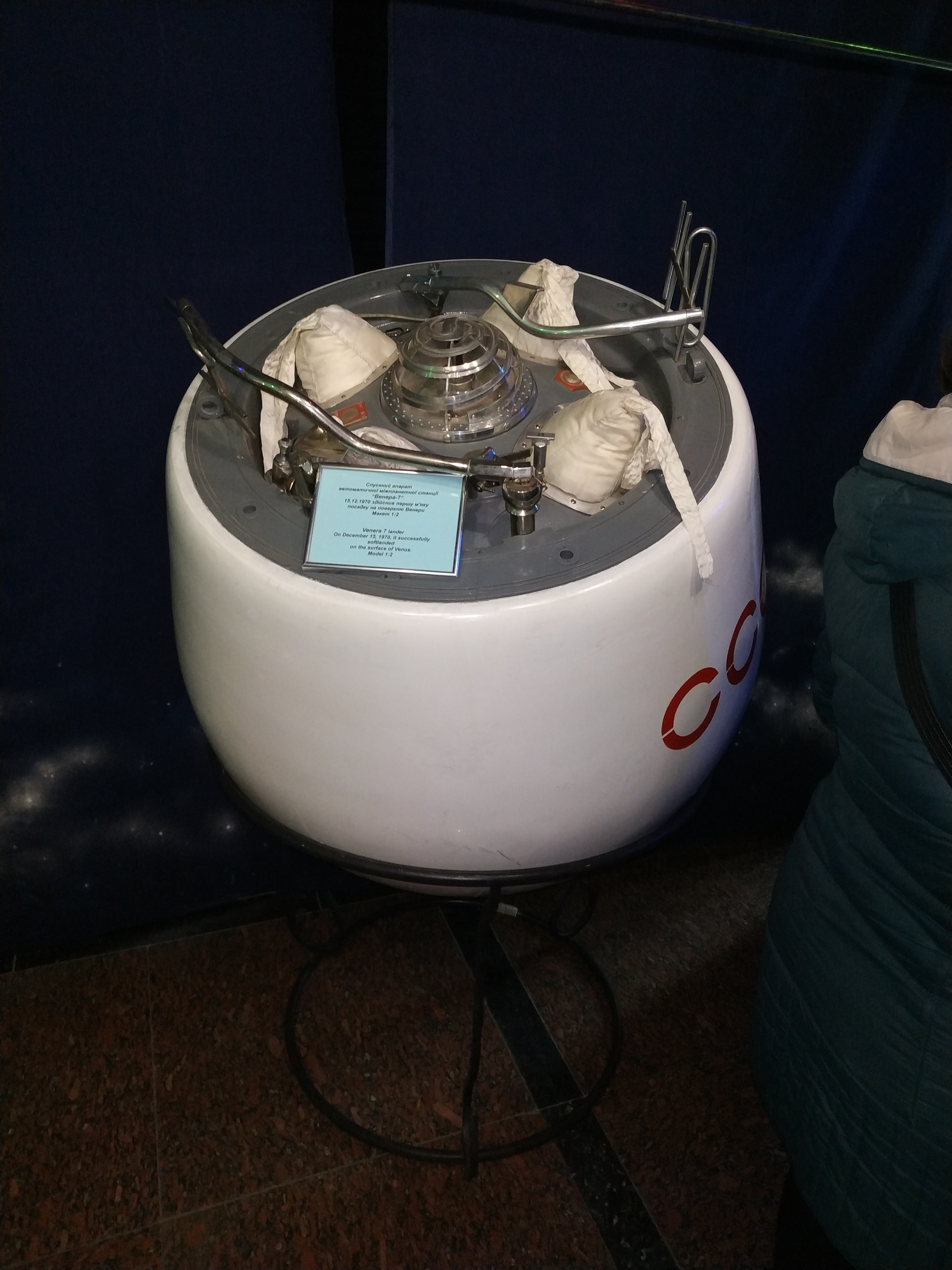
- Reproduction of the Venera 7 lander at the Sergei Pavlovich Korolyov Museum of Cosmonautics
- Mission type: Venus lander
- Operator: Lavochkin
- COSPAR ID: 1970-060A
- SATCAT no.: 4489
- Mission duration: Cruise: 3 months and 28 days Lander: 23 minutes

Spacecraft properties
- Spacecraft: 3MV No. 630
- Manufacturer: Lavochkin
- Launch mass: 1,180 kg (2,600 lb)
- Landing mass: 500 kg (1,100 lb)

Start of mission
- Launch date: 17 August 1970, 05:38:22 UTC
- Rocket: Molniya-M
- Launch site: Baikonur 31/6

End of mission
- Last contact: 15 December 1970, 06:00 UTC

Orbital parameters
- Reference system: Heliocentric
- Perihelion altitude: 0.69 AU (103 million km)
- Aphelion altitude: 1.01 AU (151 million km)
- Inclination: 2.0°
- Period: 287 days

Venus lander
- Landing date: 15 December 1970, 05:37:10 UTC
- Landing site: 5°S 351°E
Instruments
- COP-18-4M
- GS-4
- ITD
- DOW-1M
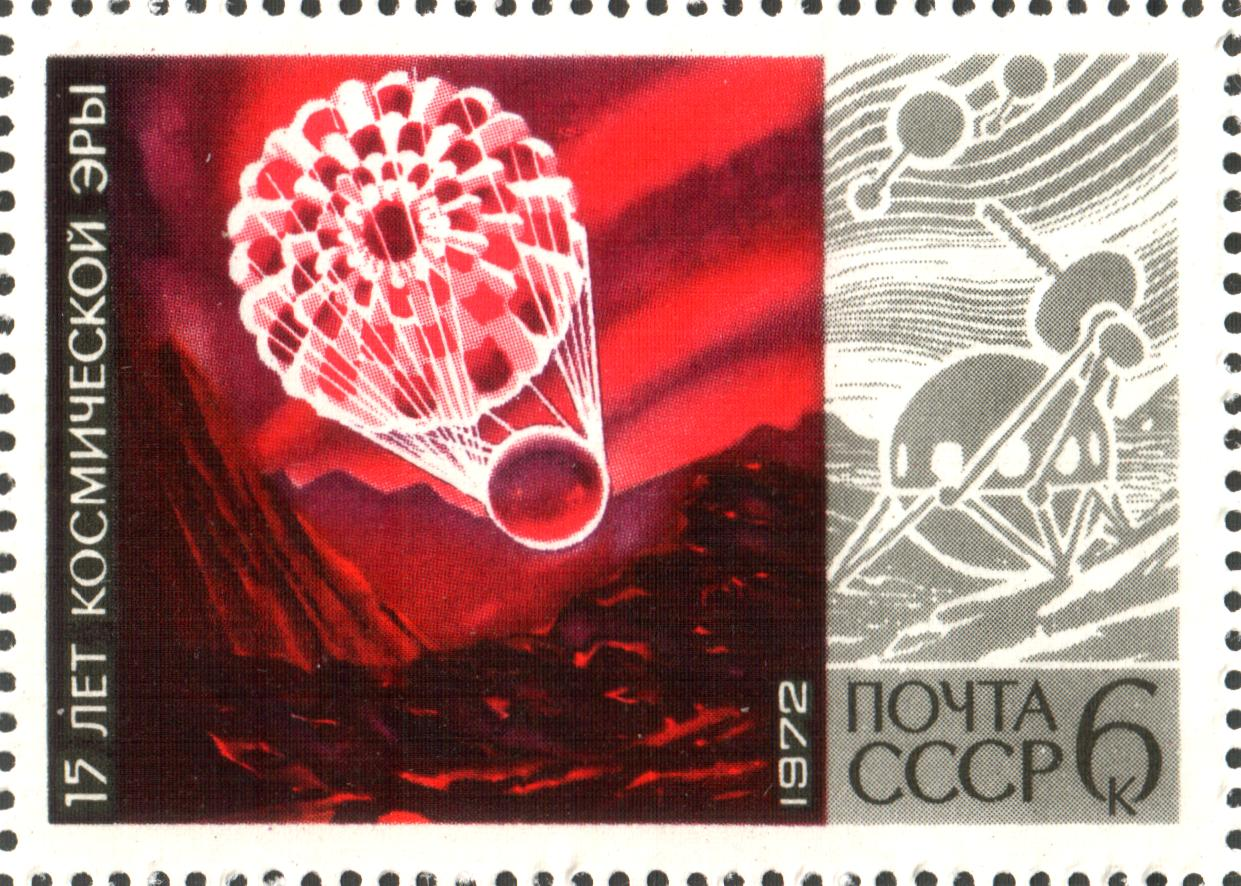
- Seal of Venera 7 Venera program

Venera 7 (Russian: Венера-7, lit. 'Venus 7') was a Soviet spacecraft, part of the Venera series of probes to Venus. When it landed on the Venusian surface on 15 December 1970, it became the first spacecraft to execute a successful soft landing on another planet and the first to transmit data from there back to Earth.

== Design ==
The lander was designed to be able to survive pressure of up to 18 megapascals (2,600 psi) and temperatures of 580 °C (1,076 °F). This was much greater than what was expected to be encountered but significant uncertainties as to the surface temperatures and pressure of Venus resulted in the designers opting for a large margin of error. This degree of hardening limited the amount of mass available for scientific instruments both on the probe itself and the interplanetary bus. The interplanetary bus carried a solar-wind charged-particle detector and a cosmic-ray detector. On the lander were temperature and pressure sensors as well as an accelerometer to measure atmospheric density. The probe also carried a radar altimeter.

== Launch ==
The probe was launched from Earth on 17 August 1970, at 05:38 UTC. It consisted of an interplanetary bus, based on the 3MV system, and a lander. During the flight to Venus, two in-course corrections were made using the bus's on-board KDU-414 engine.

== Landing ==
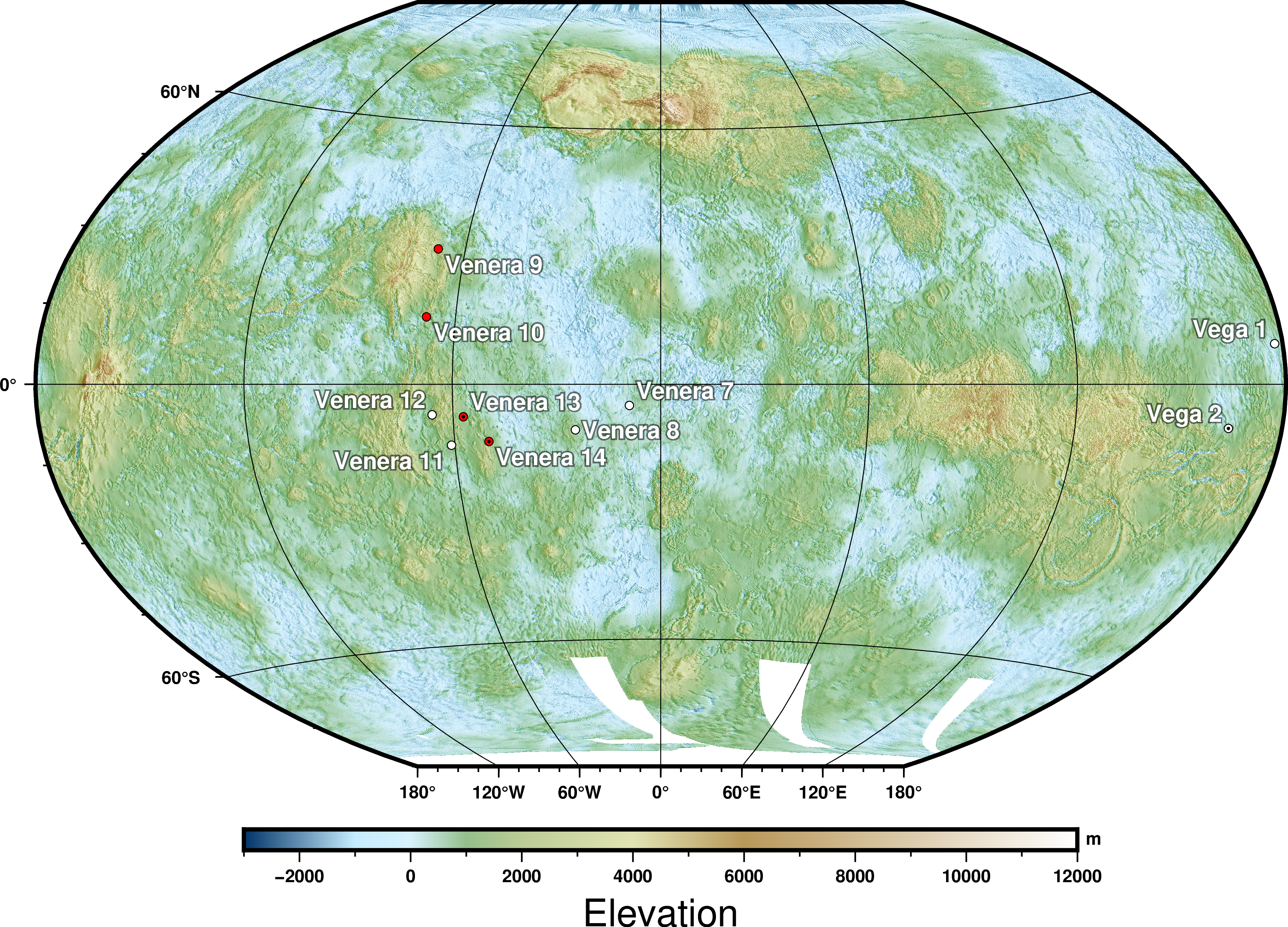
Position of Venera landing sites. Red points denote sites returning images from the surface, black central dots sites of surface sample analysis. Map based on mapping from Pioneer Venus Orbiter and Magellan.

Venera 7 entered the atmosphere of Venus on 15 December 1970. The lander remained attached to the interplanetary bus during the initial stages of atmospheric entry to allow the bus to cool the lander to −8 °C (18 °F) for as long as possible. The lander was ejected once atmospheric buffeting broke the interplanetary bus's lock-on with Earth. The parachute opened at a height of 60 kilometres (37 mi), and atmospheric testing began with results showing the atmosphere to be 97% carbon dioxide. The parachute was initially reefed down to 1.8 square metres (19 sq ft), opening to 2.5 square metres (27 sq ft) 13 minutes later, after the reefing line melted as designed. Six minutes after the unreefing, the parachute started to fail, resulting in a descent more rapid than planned. The parachute eventually failed completely, and the probe entered a period of freefall. As a result, the lander struck the surface of Venus at about 16.5 m/s (59 km/h; 37 mph) at 05:37:10 UTC. The landing coordinates are 5°S 351°E.

The probe appeared to go silent on impact, but recording tapes kept rolling. A few weeks later, upon review of the tapes by radio astronomer Oleg Rzhiga, another 23 minutes of very weak signals were found on them. The spacecraft had landed on Venus, and probably bounced onto its side, leaving the medium gain antenna aimed incorrectly for proper signal transmission to Earth.

The probe transmitted information to Earth for 53 minutes, which included about 20 minutes from the surface. It was found that the temperature at the surface of Venus was 475 ± 20 °C (887 ± 36 °F). Using this temperature and models of the atmosphere, a pressure of 9.0 ± 1.5 MPa (1,310 ± 220 psi) was calculated. From the spacecraft's rapid halt (from falling to stationary inside 0.2 second), it was possible to conclude that the craft had hit a solid surface with low levels of dust.

The probe provided information about the surface of Venus that could not be seen through its thick atmospheric veil. The spacecraft confirmed that humans cannot survive on the surface of Venus. It excluded the possibility that there is any liquid water on the planet.

== See also ==
- List of missions to Venus
- Timeline of artificial satellites and space probes
