= Phytochromobilin:ferredoxin oxidoreductase =

phytochromobilin:ferredoxin oxidoreductase

Identifiers
- EC no.: 1.3.7.4
- CAS no.: 138263-99-7

Databases
- IntEnz: IntEnz view
- BRENDA: BRENDA entry
- ExPASy: NiceZyme view
- KEGG: KEGG entry
- MetaCyc: metabolic pathway
- PRIAM: profile
- PDB structures: RCSB PDB PDBe PDBsum
- Gene Ontology: AmiGO / QuickGO
Search
- PMC: articles
- PubMed: articles
- NCBI: proteins

In enzymology, phytochromobilin:ferredoxin oxidoreductase (EC 1.3.7.4) is an enzyme that catalyzes the chemical reaction

biliverdin
+ reduced
ferredoxin
(3Z)-phytochromobilin
+ oxidised
ferredoxin

The two substrates of this enzyme are biliverdin and reduced ferredoxin. Its products are (3Z)-phytochromobilin and oxidized ferredoxin.

This enzyme belongs to the family of oxidoreductases, specifically those acting on the CH-CH group of donor with an iron-sulfur protein as acceptor. The systematic name of this enzyme class is (3Z)-phytochromobilin:ferredoxin oxidoreductase. Other names in common use include HY2, PPhiB synthase, and phytochromobilin synthase. This enzyme participates in porphyrin and chlorophyll metabolism.
