= Crown (botany) =

All of an individual plant's aboveground parts

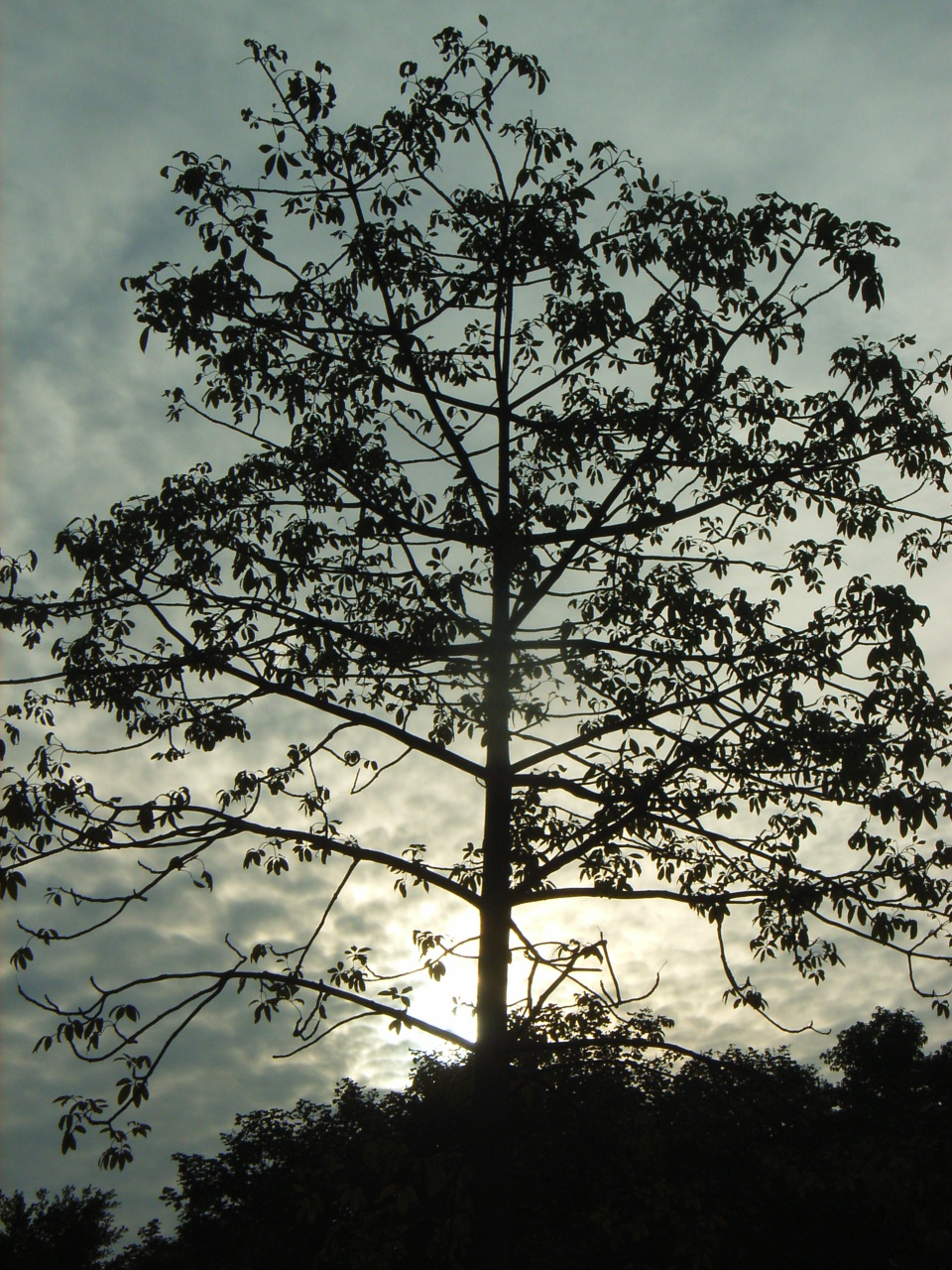
Tree crown

The crown of a plant is the total of an individual plant's aboveground parts, including stems, leaves, and reproductive structures. A plant community canopy consists of one or more plant crowns growing in a given area.

The crown of a woody plant (tree, shrub, liana) is the branches, leaves, and reproductive structures extending from the trunk or main stems.

Shapes of crowns are highly variable. The major types for trees are the excurrent branching habit resulting in conoid shapes and decurrent (deliquescent) branching habit, resulting in round shapes. Crowns are also characterized by their width, depth, surface area, volume, and density. Measurements of crowns are important in quantifying and qualifying plant health, growth stage, and efficiency.

Major functions of the crown include light energy assimilation, carbon dioxide absorption and release of oxygen via photosynthesis, energy release by respiration, and movement of water to the atmosphere by transpiration. These functions are performed by the leaves.

== Crown classes ==
Trees can be described as fitting different crown classes. Commonly used are Kraft's classes. Kraft designated these "social classes" based on temperate and boreal forests in Central Europe, so they do not necessarily work with every forest type in the world. Below are Kraft's "social classes" translated into English from his original classifications written in German:

- 1 v vorherrschend (predominant)
- 2 h herrschend (dominant)
- 3 m mitherrschend (co-dominant)
- 4 b beherrscht (dominated / suppressed)
- 5 u unterständig (inferior) this is then split into 2 subclasses 5a (shade tolerant trees) and 5b (dying crowns / dying trees)

Often it has been simplified to Dominant, Co-dominant and Suppressed.

Also IUFRO developed a tree classification it is based on three components with numbers that then aggregate to give a coded classification thus:

Ecological criteria

Height component (Stand layer / Height class):

- 100 Overstorey / Overlayer
- 200 Middlestorey / Middlelayer
- 300 Understorey / Underlayer

Vitality component (Tree vigor / vitality):

- 10 Lush
- 20 Normal
- 30 Retarded

Future growth potential component (Developmental tendency / conversion tendency):

- 1 High
- 2 Average
- 3 Lagging

and then additionally

Silvicultural criteria

Commercial worth

- 400 Valuable, outstanding tree
- 500 Usable, wood
- 600 Poor to Unusable Quality

Trunk class

- 40 Valuable wood (≥50% of the trunk is high-quality timber)
- 50 Normal wood (≥50% of the trunk is normal-quality timber)
- 60 Substandard wood (<50% of the trunk is normal-quality timber)

Crown class

- 4 Deep crown (>½ the tree length)
- 5 Medium crown
- 6 Shallow crown (<¼ the tree length)

While both Kraft and IUFRO classifications are aimed at describing individual tree crowns both can and are applied to describe whole layers or storeys.

== See also ==
- Apical dominance
- Canopy (biology)
- Canopy (grape)
- Crown shyness
- Diameter at breast height
- Fruit tree forms
- Growth habit (determinate growth, indeterminate growth, etc.)
- Habit (biology)
- Pruning
- Shoot
- Stratification (vegetation)
- Tree crown measurement
- Tiller (botany)
- Understory
