= Tanada effect =

The Tanada effect refers to the adhesion of root tips to glass surfaces. It is believed to involve electric potentials. It is named for the scientist who first described the effect, Takuma Tanada.

The phenomenon was observed while Dr. Tanada was rinsing glassware and noticed that excised root tips occasionally stuck to pyrex beakers. Upon investigating the phenomenon closely he determined that this process could be studied in a mixture of ATP, ascorbate, auxin, magnesium, manganese and potassium. The tips would stick when the beaker was swirled slowly.

Most importantly, the reaction was light-dependent. Exposure to red light would cause the tips to stick, while exposure to far-red would allow them to release. This simple experiment was indicative of phytochrome function, and the rapid nature of the response suggested that changes in bioelectric potential were seminal events in phytochrome signal propagation.

Root tips stick to glass surfaces because they acquire a positive electrostatic charge due to some unknown effect from exposure to red light. The glass surface has a negative charge due to adsorbed phosphate ions. The opposite charges attract each other.

This phenomenon is the first reported generation of a bioelectric potential by a photomorphogenic pigment.

Several years later, Dr. Tanada found that the electric charge is generated by the trace element boron. Root tips from plants deficient in boron fail to stick to glass. In a dilute solution of boric acid, these tips gradually stick to the glass.
