= Katrina Forest =

American biologist

Katrina T. Forest
- Born: 1966 (age 59–60)
- Education: Princeton University; Massachusetts Institute of Technology
- Scientific career
- Workplaces: University of Wisconsin at Madison; Scripps Research
- Thesis: X-ray and electron crystallography applied to pertussis toxin (1993)

Katrina T. Forest (born 1966) is an American biologist who is the EB Fred Professor of Bacteriology and Chair in the Department of Bacteriology at the University of Wisconsin–Madison. Her research considers the use of structural biology to better understand pathogenesis. Forest is a Fellow of the American Society for Microbiology.

== Early life and education ==
Forest was born in Honolulu. Her father was in the United States Navy, and she lived in Philadelphia, Baltimore and Madison during her childhood. She was encouraged to study science at university, and eventually completed her bachelor's degree at the Massachusetts Institute of Technology. Her mother became unwell whilst she was an undergraduate student, and Forest spent a semester closer to home at the University of Wisconsin–Madison. She moved to Princeton University for her doctoral research, where she used x-ray crystallography to understand pertussis toxin. Forest was a postdoctoral researcher at Scripps Research where she specialized in protein crystallography.

== Research and career ==
Forest was appointed to the faculty at the University of Wisconsin–Madison in 1998. She was promoted to Professor in 2009. She was the first to realize the three-dimensional structures of a bacterial phytochrome, and predicted that the bacteriophytochrome architecture first arose around one billion years ago. The phytochrome tells plants when to germinate and when not to germinate, as well as identifying where plants should grow to absorb the most light possible. She derived the phytochrome from Deinococcus radiodurans, a species of bacterium that was known to be tolerant to ionising radiation. The phytochrome was isolated, crystallized and investigated using x-ray crystallography. Forest identified that the protein had a knot, which she predicts may serve to stabilize the protein so that it can capture sunlight. In the absence of such a structure, Forest believes that the phytochrome would undergo a conformational change under illumination, and wouldn't be able to effectively capture the sunlight. Such structures can store the light they absorb for several days, which allows the plant to predict where the light may come from each day. Forest went on to study the light-harvesting mechanisms of actinobacteria, identifying two light-capturing molecular components that absorb light at different energies.

Recognizing the impact of protein molecular structure on biological function, Forest turned to the design of novel proteins with tuneable properties. Amongst these, she identified a stable synthetic collagen that may offer hope for conditions such as arthritis. The modified protein contains less flexible amino acids to the original form, which stiffens the structure and helps the protein to maintain structural integrity even when exposed to elevated temperatures.

Forest worked with Laura L. Kiessling to investigate the protein Intelectin, demonstrating that it can identify different types of pathogens and distinguish pathogens from human cells. The pair showed that this protein is upregulated during infection, indicating that it might have some antimicrobial properties.

Alongside her work on proteins, Forest has studied Type IV pili (T4P), organelles that mediate the attachment of bacteria to one another. Forest has investigated the mechanisms and dynamics of the pilus proteins that make up T4P.

== Awards and honors ==
- 2001 Keck Foundation Distinguished Young Scholars in Medical Research Award
- 2003 University of Wisconsin–Madison CALS Pound Research Award
- 2015 Fellow of the Institut d'Etudes Avancées d'Aix-Marseille Université
- 2015 Fellow of the American Academy of Microbiology
- 2018 University of Wisconsin–Madison Vilas Associates Award
- 2023 Fellow of the American Association for the Advancement of Science

== Selected publications ==
- Hans E. Parge; Katrina T. Forest; Michael J. Hickey; Deborah A. Christensen; Elizabeth D. Getzoff; John A. Tainer (2 November 1995). "Structure of the fibre-forming protein pilin at 2.6 A resolution". Nature. 378 (6552): 32–8. doi:10.1038/378032a0. ISSN 1476-4687. PMID 7477282. Wikidata Q27729288.
- Jeremiah R Wagner; Joseph S Brunzelle; Katrina T Forest; Richard D Vierstra (1 November 2005). "A light-sensing knot revealed by the structure of the chromophore-binding domain of phytochrome". Nature. 438 (7066): 325–331. doi:10.1038/nature04118. ISSN 1476-4687. PMID 16292304. Wikidata Q46808052.
- Michelle Lane; Barry D. Bavister; Elizabeth A. Lyons; Katrina T. Forest (1 December 1999). "Containerless vitrification of mammalian oocytes and embryos". Nature Biotechnology. 17 (12): 1234–1236. doi:10.1038/70795. ISSN 1087-0156. PMID 10585728. Wikidata Q41617909.

== Personal life ==
Forest lives with her husband in Madison, Wisconsin.
