= Photomorphogenesis =

Light-mediated plant development

In developmental biology, photomorphogenesis is light-mediated development, where plant growth patterns respond to the light spectrum. This is a completely separate process from photosynthesis where light is used as a source of energy. Phytochromes, cryptochromes, and phototropins are photochromic sensory receptors that restrict the photomorphogenic effect of light to the UV-A, UV-B, blue, and red portions of the electromagnetic spectrum.

The photomorphogenesis of plants is often studied by using tightly frequency-controlled light sources to grow the plants. There are at least three stages of plant development where photomorphogenesis occurs: seed germination, seedling development, and the switch from the vegetative to the flowering stage (photoperiodism).

Most research on photomorphogenesis is derived from plants studies involving several kingdoms: Fungi, Monera, Protista, and Plantae.

== History ==
Theophrastus of Eresus (371 to 287 BC) may have been the first to write about photomorphogenesis. He described the different wood qualities of fir trees grown in different levels of light, likely the result of the photomorphogenic "shade-avoidance" effect. In 1686, John Ray wrote "Historia Plantarum" which mentioned the effects of etiolation (grow in the absence of light). Charles Bonnet introduced the term "etiolement" to the scientific literature in 1754 when describing his experiments, commenting that the term was already in use by gardeners. The specific effects of periods of light on photomorphogenesis was the 1941 thesis subject of Marie Clark Taylor, an African American pioneer, being the first woman to earn a Science doctorate at Fordham University.

== Developmental stages affected ==
=== Seed germination ===
Light has profound effects on the development of plants. The most striking effects of light are observed when a germinating seedling emerges from the soil and is exposed to light for the first time.

Normally the seedling radicle (root) emerges first from the seed, and the shoot appears as the root becomes established. Later, with growth of the shoot (particularly when it emerges into the light) there is increased secondary root formation and branching. In this coordinated progression of developmental responses are early manifestations of correlative growth phenomena where the root affects the growth of the shoot and vice versa. To a large degree, the growth responses are hormone mediated.

=== Seedling development ===
In the absence of light, plants develop an etiolated growth pattern. Etiolation of the seedling causes it to become elongated, which may facilitate it emerging from the soil.

A seedling that emerges in darkness follows a developmental program known as skotomorphogenesis (dark development), which is characterized by etiolation. Upon exposure to light, the seedling switches rapidly to photomorphogenesis (light development).

There are differences when comparing dark-grown (etiolated) and light-grown (de-etiolated) seedlings

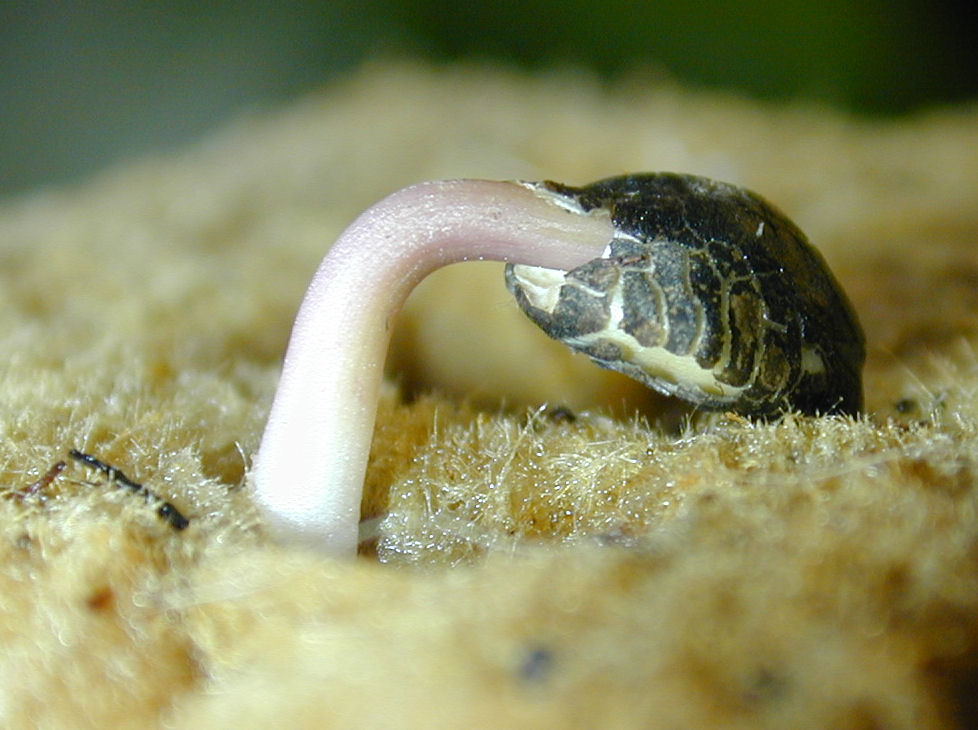
A dicot seedling emerging from the ground displays an apical hook (in the hypocotyl in this case), a response to dark conditions

Etiolated characteristics:

- Distinct apical hook (dicot) or coleoptile (monocot)
- No leaf growth
- No chlorophyll
- Rapid stem elongation
- Limited radial expansion of stem
- Limited root elongation
- Limited production of lateral roots

De-etiolated characteristics:

- Apical hook opens or coleoptile splits open
- Leaf growth promoted
- Chlorophyll produced
- Stem elongation suppressed
- Radial expansion of stem
- Root elongation promoted
- Lateral root development accelerated

The developmental changes characteristic of photomorphogenesis shown by de-etiolated seedlings, are induced by light.

=== Photoperiodism ===
Some plants rely on light signals to determine when to switch from the vegetative to the flowering stage of plant development. This type of photomorphogenesis is known as photoperiodism and involves using red photoreceptors (phytochromes) to determine the daylength. As a result, photoperiodic plants only start making flowers when the days have reached a "critical daylength," allowing these plants to initiate their flowering period according to the time of year. For example, "long day" plants need long days to start flowering, and "short day" plants need to experience short days before they will start making flowers.

Photoperiodism also has an effect on vegetative growth, including on bud dormancy in perennial plants, though this is not as well-documented as the effect of photoperiodism on the switch to the flowering stage.

== Light receptors for photomorphogenesis ==
Typically, plants are responsive to wavelengths of light in the blue, red and far-red regions of the spectrum through the action of several different photosensory systems. The photoreceptors for red and far-red wavelengths are known as phytochromes. There are at least 5 members of the phytochrome family of photoreceptors. There are several blue light photoreceptors known as cryptochromes. The combination of phytochromes and cryptochromes mediate growth and the flowering of plants in response to red light, far-red light, and blue light.

=== Red/far-red light ===
Plants use phytochrome to detect and respond to red and far-red wavelengths. Phytochromes are signaling proteins that promote photomorphogenesis in response to red light and far-red light. Phytochrome is the only known photoreceptor that absorbs light in the red/far red spectrum of light (600-750 nm) specifically and only for photosensory purposes. Phytochromes are proteins with a light absorbing pigment attached called a chromophore. The chromophore is a linear tetrapyrrole called phytochromobilin.

There are two forms of phytochromes: red light absorbing, Pr, and far-red light absorbing, Pfr. Pfr, which is the active form of phytochromes, can be reverted to Pr, which is the inactive form, slowly by inducing darkness or more rapidly by irradiation by far-red light. The phytochrome apoprotein, a protein that together with a prosthetic group forms a particular biochemical molecule such as a hormone or enzyme, is synthesized in the Pr form. Upon binding the chromophore, the holoprotein, an apoprotein combined with its prosthetic group, becomes sensitive to light. If it absorbs red light it will change conformation to the biologically active Pfr form. The Pfr form can absorb far red light and switch back to the Pr form. The Pfr promotes and regulates photomorphogenesis in response to FR light, whereas Pr regulates de-etiolation in response to R light.

Most plants have multiple phytochromes encoded by different genes. The different forms of phytochrome control different responses but there is also redundancy so that in the absence of one phytochrome, another may take on the missing functions. There are five genes that encode phytochromes in the Arabidopsis thaliana genetic model, PHYA-PHYE. PHYA is involved in the regulation of photomorphogenesis in response to far-red light. PHYB is involved in regulating photoreversible seed germination in response to red light. PHYC mediates the response between PHYA and PHYB. PHYD and PHYE mediate elongation of the internode and control the time in which the plant flowers.

Molecular analyses of phytochrome and phytochrome-like genes in higher plants (ferns, mosses, algae) and photosynthetic bacteria have shown that phytochromes evolved from prokaryotic photoreceptors that predated the origin of plants.

Takuma Tanada observed that the root tips of barley adhered to the sides of a beaker with a negatively charged surface after being treated with red light, yet released after being exposed to far-red light. For mung bean it was the opposite, where far-red light exposure caused the root tips to adhere, and red light caused the roots to detach. This effect of red and far-red light on root tips is now known as the Tanada effect.

=== Blue light ===
Plants contain multiple blue light photoreceptors which have different functions. Based on studies with action spectra, mutants and molecular analyses, it has been determined that higher plants contain at least 4, and probably 5, different blue light photoreceptors.

Cryptochromes were the first blue light receptors to be isolated and characterized from any organism, and are responsible for the blue light reactions in photomorphogenesis. The proteins use a flavin as a chromophore. The cryptochromes have evolved from microbial DNA-photolyase, an enzyme that carries out light-dependent repair of UV damaged DNA. There are two different forms of cryptochromes that have been identified in plants, CRY1 and CRY2, which regulate the inhibition of hypocotyl elongation in response to blue light. Cryptochromes control stem elongation, leaf expansion, circadian rhythms and flowering time. In addition to blue light, cryptochromes also perceive long wavelength UV irradiation (UV-A). Since the cryptochromes were discovered in plants, several labs have identified homologous genes and photoreceptors in a number of other organisms, including humans, mice and flies.

There are blue light photoreceptors that are not a part of photomorphogenesis. For example, phototropin is the blue light photoreceptor that controls phototropism.

=== UV light ===
Plants show various responses to UV light. UVR8 has been shown to be a UV-B receptor. Plants undergo distinct photomorphogenic changes as a result of UV-B radiation. They have photoreceptors that initiate morphogenetic changes in the plant embryo (hypocotyl, epicotyl, radicle) Exposure to UV- light in plants mediates biochemical pathways, photosynthesis, plant growth and many other processes essential to plant development. The UV-B photoreceptor, UV Resistance Locus8 (UVR8) detects UV-B rays and elicits photomorphogenic responses. These response are important for initiating hypocotyl elongation, leaf expansion, biosynthesis of flavonoids and many other important processes that affect the root-shoot system. Exposure to UV-B rays can be damaging to DNA inside of the plant cells, however, UVR8 induces genes required to acclimate plants to UV-B radiation, these genes are responsible for many biosynthesis pathways that involve protection from UV damage, oxidative stress, and photorepair of DNA damage.

There is still much to be discovered about the mechanisms involved in UV-B radiation and UVR8. Scientists are working to understand the pathways responsible for plant UV receptors response to solar radiation in natural environments.
