= Takuma Tanada =

American plant biologist

- Born: October 20, 1919; Hawaii, U.S.
- Died: January 4, 2018 (aged 98); California, U.S.
- Education: B.S., M.S., University of Hawaiʻi, 1942, 1944 in Botany
- Scientific career
- Fields: Botany, Photomorphogenesis

Takuma Akuma Tanada (Japanese: 棚田 琢磨, October 30, 1919 – January 4, 2018) was an American plant biologist who made several discoveries related to the effects of light radiation on plants, including his discovery of the Tanada effect. He conducted research at the United States Department of Agriculture and in 2011 was awarded a Congressional Gold Medal, the highest civilian award in the United States, for his assistance to the U.S. military in World War II.

Tanada was born in Hawaii in 1919 to Japanese immigrants. Tanada attended the University of Hawaii studying botany, and received a B.S. in 1942, and a M.S. in 1944. Tanada and his brother Shigeo volunteered for the Army. Tanada said he was rejected when he initially tried to join the military after the attack on Pearl Harbor, but was drafted later in part due to being fluent in Japanese. He enlisted on June 21, 1944. He translated top-secret Japanese communications for the Military Intelligence Service and was promoted to technical sergeant.

After World War II ended, Tanada became an administrator to import and manufacture fertilizer. Tanada was assigned to the United States Department of Agriculture, where he published works related to the effects of red and far-red light on plant roots. The photomorphogenic processes he discovered in relation to light spectrum on plant root adhesion became known as the Tanada effect. He later discovered that the electric charge causing roots to stick to glass is generated by the trace element boron.

Tanada married Toshiyo Shimizu on February 21, 1947, in Yokohama, Japan.

Tanada retired to Napa with his wife in 1983 to be close to Juliet Tanada, their daughter, an optometry teacher at Berkeley. His wife died in 1986. In retirement Tanada was still growing a large fruit and vegetable garden in Browns Valley. He died in January 2018 at the age of 98.

== Key publications ==
- Tanada, T. (1968). "A rapid photoreversible response of barley root tips in the presence of 3-indoleacetic Acid". Proceedings of the National Academy of Sciences. 59 (2): 376–380. Bibcode:1968PNAS...59..376T. doi:10.1073/pnas.59.2.376. PMC 224682. PMID 16591610.
- Tanada, T. (1968). "Substances essential for a red, far-red light reversible attachment of mung bean root tips to glass". Plant Physiology. 43 (12): 2070–2071. doi:10.1104/pp.43.12.2070. PMC 1087129. PMID 16657012.
- Tanada, T. (1972). "Phytochrome Control of Another Phytochrome-mediated Process". Plant Physiology. 49 (4): 560–562. doi:10.1104/pp.49.4.560. PMC 366005. PMID 16658001.
- Tanada, T. (1974). "Boron-induced Bioelectric Field Change in Mung Bean Hypocotyl". Plant Physiology. 53 (5): 775–776. doi:10.1104/pp.53.5.775. PMC 541444. PMID 16658788.
