= Far-red light =

Range of light at the extreme red end of the visible spectrum

The visible spectrum; far-red is located at the far right.

Far-red light is a range of light at the extreme red end of the visible spectrum, just before infrared light. Usually regarded as the region between 700 and 750 nm wavelength, it is dimly visible to human eyes. It is largely reflected or transmitted by plants because of the absorbance spectrum of chlorophyll, and it is perceived by the plant photoreceptor phytochrome. However, some organisms can use it as a source of energy in photosynthesis. Far-red light also is used for vision by certain organisms such as some species of deep-sea fishes and mantis shrimp.

== In horticulture ==
Plants perceive light through internal photoreceptors absorbing a specified wavelength signaling (photomorphogenesis) or transferring the energy to a plant process (photosynthesis). In plants, the photoreceptors cryptochrome and phototropin absorb radiation in the blue and UV/A regions of the spectrum (λ=340-500 nm) and regulate hypocotyl inhibition, flowering time, and phototropism, whereas phytochrome photoreceptors absorb in the red (R: λ=630–700 nm) and far-red (FR: λ=700-750 nm) regions and influence many aspects of plant development such as germination, seedling etiolation, transition to flowering, shade avoidance, and tropisms. Phytochrome has the ability to interchange its conformation based on the quantity or quality of light it perceives and does so via photoconversion from phytochrome red (Pr) to phytochrome far-red (Pfr). Pr is the inactive form of phytochrome, ready to perceive red light. In a high R:FR environment, Pr changes conformation to the active form of phytochrome Pfr. Once active, Pfr translocates to the cellular nucleus, binds to phytochrome interacting factors (PIF), and targets the PIFs to the proteasome for degradation. Exposed to a low R:FR environment, Pfr absorbs FR and changes conformation back to the inactive Pr. The inactive conformation will remain in the cytosol, allowing PIFs to target their binding site on the genome and induce expression (i.e. shade avoidance through cellular elongation). FR irradiation can lead to compromised plant immunity and increased pathogen susceptibility.

FR has long been considered a minimal input in photosynthesis. In the early 1970s, physics PhD and soil crop professor Keith J. McCree lobbied for a standard definition of photosynthetically active radiation (PAR: λ=400–700 nm) which did not include FR. More recently, scientists have provided evidence that a broader spectrum called photo-biologically active radiation (PBAR: λ=280–800 nm) is more applicable terminology. This range of wavelengths not only includes FR, but also UV-A and UV-B. The Emerson effect established that the rate of photosynthesis in red and green algae was higher when exposed to R and FR than the sum of the two individually. This research laid the ground work for the elucidation of the dual photosystems in plants. Photosystem I (PSI) and photosystem II (PSII) work synergistically; through photochemical processes PSII transports electrons to PSI. Any imbalance between R and FR leads to unequal excitation between PSI and PSII, thereby reducing the efficiency of photochemistry.

== See also ==
- Crown shyness
