= Shade avoidance =

Plant sensing and development response

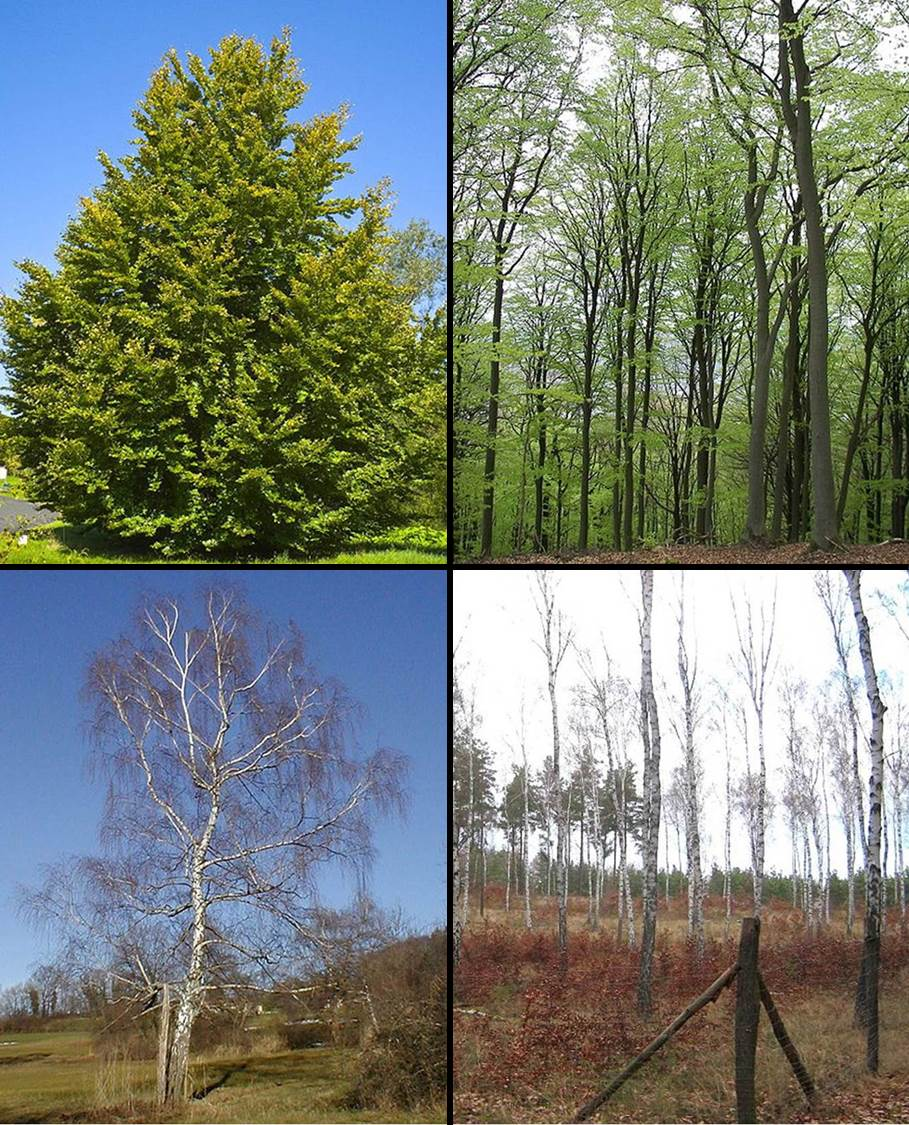
Individual and densely standing trees to demonstrate the shadow escape: in the forest, trees compete for light and show an apical aldominance that is characteristic of the shadow escape.

Shade avoidance is a set of responses that plants display when they are subjected to the shade of another plant. It often includes elongation, altered flowering time, increased apical dominance and altered partitioning of resources. This set of responses is collectively called the shade-avoidance syndrome (SAS).

Shade responses display varying strength along a continuum. Most plants are neither extreme shade avoiders or tolerators, but possess a combination of the two strategies; this helps adapt them to their environment. However, the ability to perceive and respond to shade plays a very important role in all plants: they are sessile by nature and access to photosynthetically active radiation is essential for plant nutrition and growth. In addition, the time at which a plant starts to flower is affected by the amount of light that is available.

Over the past few decades, major increases in grain yield have come largely through increasing planting densities. As planting densities increase so does the proportion of far red light in the canopy. Thus, it is likely that plant breeders have selected for lines with reduced SAS in their efforts to produce high yields at high density.

== Sensing shade ==
Plants can tell the difference between the shade of an inanimate object (e.g. a rock) and the shade of another plant, as well as the presence of nearby plants that may compete with and shade it in the future. In the shade of a plant, far red light is present in a higher irradiance than red light, as a result of the absorption of the red light by the pigments involved in photosynthesis, while a nearby plant forms an intermediate ratio. This is known as far red enrichment. Phytochrome can be used to measure the ratio of far red to red light, and thus to detect whether the plant is in the shade of another plant, so it can alter its growth strategy accordingly (photomorphogenesis). In Arabidopsis, phytochrome B is the predominant photoreceptor that regulates SAS. Phytochromes exist in two forms: P_{R} and P_{FR}. It is synthesised as P_{R}, but red light triggers a conformational change, producing P_{FR}. Far red light causes the phytochrome to be converted back into P_{R}. For a given red:far red light ratio, there will be a dynamic equilibrium in the relative quantities of P_{R} and P_{FR} present. Far red enrichment causes a build-up of P_{R}. If P_{R} is present above a species-specific threshold, shade avoidance signal transduction pathways will be activated.

== Seedling response ==
Seedling response is the most well understood factor of shade avoidance. In the model organism Arabidopsis thaliana, the shade avoidance response varies at different points in the life cycle. Dry, dormant seeds will not germinate if they are in the shade. Once dormancy has been broken and they have imbibed water, the seeds are committed to germination. Water-imbibed seeds display hypocotyl elongation; if the shade were caused by excessive soil depth, this would help the seedling grow vertically very quickly and push up and out of the ground. If an Arabidopsis seedling becomes shaded, its petioles and internodes elongate. It may even lose rosette morphology.

=== Pathway ===
Studies using Brassica rapa indicate that the light quality and ratio available to seedlings is sensed in the cotyledons, which upregulates the production of auxin. Arabidopsis was used to demonstrate PIF (Phytochrome Interacting Factor) involvement in auxin production. PIFs are transcription factors that regulate thousands of genes related to germination repression and shade avoidance, and PIF4, PIF5, and PIF7 directly regulate genes that code for the enzymes required in auxin synthesis. Other PIF proteins are thought to be involved in regulating auxin and the plant's response. In shade conditions, P_{R} induces the dephosphorylation of PIF proteins, which strengthens their ability to bind DNA and promote transcription of genes involved in shade avoidance response, including in the production of auxin and its receptors. Where the auxin lay, the plant grows on that side which causes it to bend in the opposite direction. Auxin is transported to the hypocotyl to promote elongation, although the mechanism it uses to do so remains unclear.

== Adult response ==
Shade avoidance response in adult plants is less commonly studied than it is in seedlings, though adult Arabidopsis show more complex response patterns than seedlings. Shaded adults have elongated petioles at the rosette, smaller leaf blades, and suppressed axillary bud growth. By elongating the petiole sideways, the plant repositions its leaves away from shading plants to absorb more red light, though there is a trade off in leaf size. The leaves can also bend upwards towards potential light sources as a result of higher growth on the underside of the petiole than the top, a process called hyponasty. Flattening of leaves in plants with normally curled leaves also increases surface area for light absorption.

If a mature plant becomes shaded, shade avoidance also often prompts changes in reproductive strategies. Plants may flower early, as it is unlikely that growing more structures will result in profitable nutrient gain in the short term. In Arabidopsis, early flowering is linked to overall lower reproductive success due to lower seed production, smaller fruit, and lower germination rate of seeds, although germination success is also dependent on genetic variation between individuals.

=== Pathway ===
Like seedlings, adult plant shade avoidance involves several mechanisms acting together. Petiole elongation is both a result of cell expansion and cell division, though not at the same stage in petiole and leaf formation. In newly growing leaves, cell division is the primary factor, while fully formed leaves and petioles rely on cell expansion. Xyloglucan endotransglucosylase/hydrolases (XTHs) are a family of cell wall modifying proteins. In shade conditions, the genes coding for XTH9, XTH15/XTR7, XTH16, XTH17, and XTH19 are up-regulated and these proteins act to hydrolyze and weaken the cell wall, allowing for expansion of the petiole cells. Like in seedlings, PIF7 is involved in the regulation of petiole and leaf growth due to low R:FR, by up-regulating auxin-related and brassinosteroid-response genes which promote growth. Auxin signalling is also essential to hyponasty, though its role is not yet fully understood.
Leaf curling is primarily a response to phytochrome B converting to P_{R} in shade conditions, which promotes unequal proliferation and growth of cells on the upper and lower leaf sides. Two redundant genes, ATHB4 and HAT3, code for transcription factors that regulate leaf curling, with loss of function mutants having plants with leaves that curl downwards, and plants with over-expressive copies of these genes having leaves that curl strongly upwards. By changing expression of these genes, plants can straighten their leaves in response to shade.
