= Timeline of the Space Race =

This is a timeline of achievements in Soviet and United States spaceflight, spanning the Cold War era of competition known as the Space Race.

This list is limited to first achievements by the USSR and USA which were important during the Space Race in terms of public perception and/or technical innovation. This excludes first uses of specific on-board equipment and new scientific discoveries, or achievements by other countries.

== Beginning ==
Date	Country	Achievement	Mission / Vehicle
1955 July 29	(United States) USA	The United States announces their intention to launch an artificial satellite during the International Geophysical Year (1 July 1957 to 31 December 1958).	/
1955 August 30	(Soviet Union) USSR	In the Soviet Union, the commission approved launching a 1 ton satellite using the R-7 ICBM.	/

== 1957–1959 ==
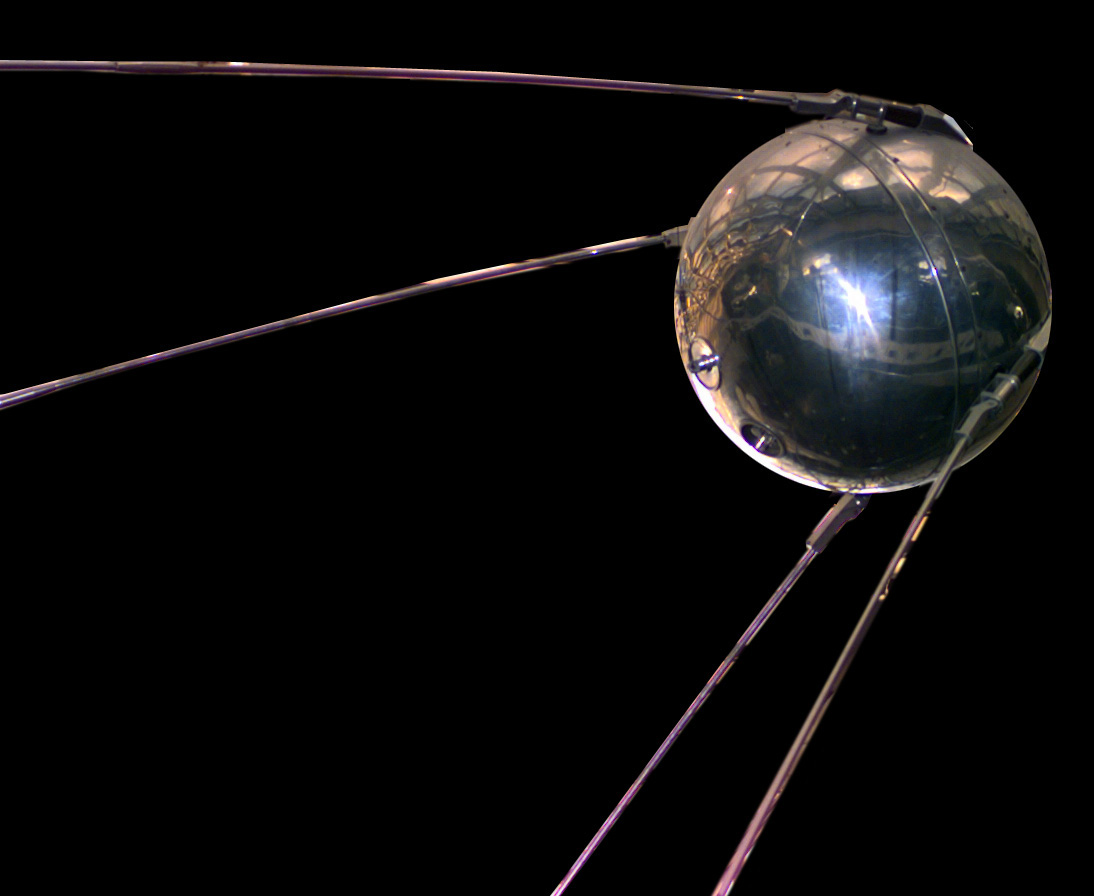
First artificial satellite, Sputnik 1 (replica)

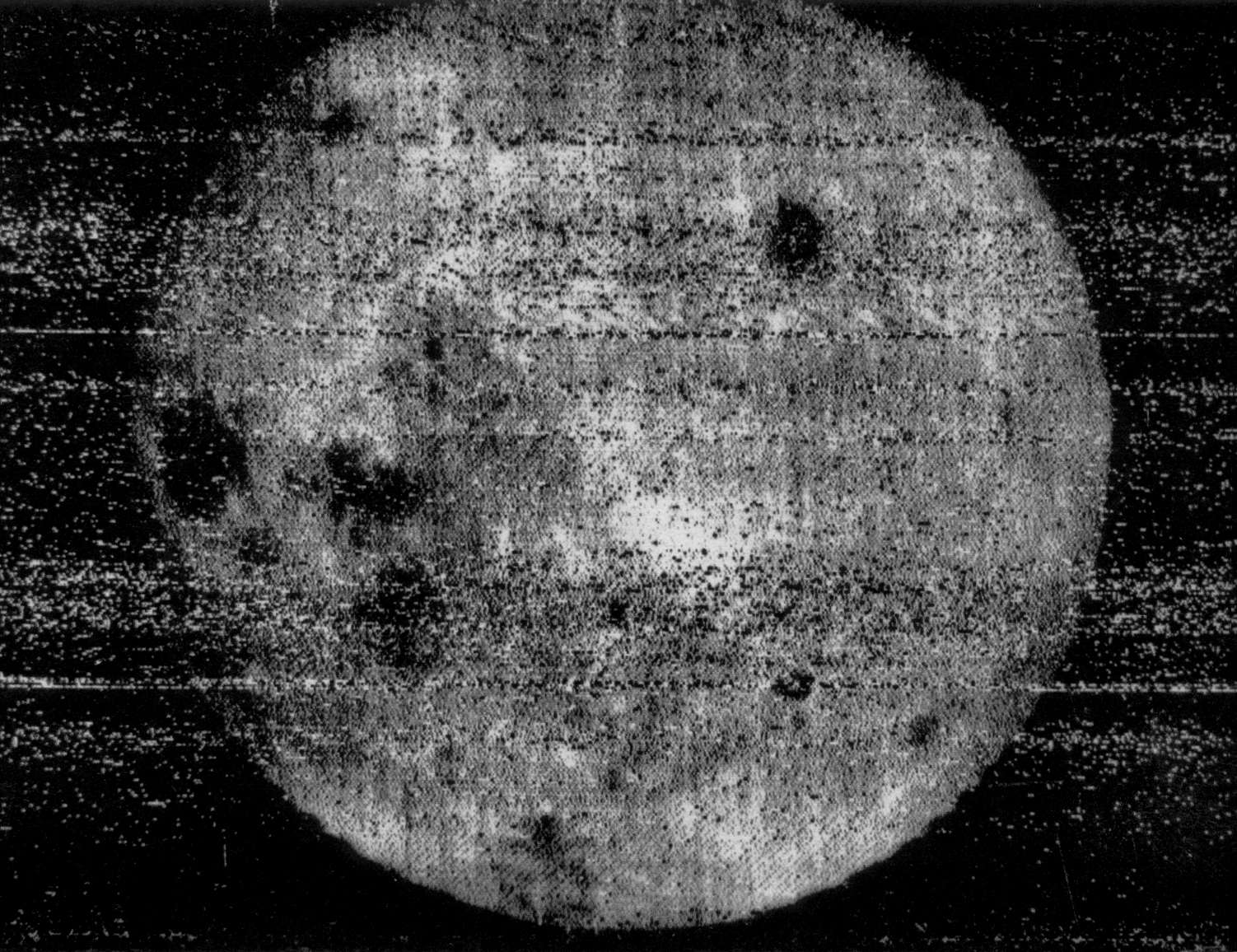
First photograph of far side of the Moon, Luna 3

Date	Country	Achievement	Mission / Vehicle
1957 August 21	(Soviet Union) USSR	First intercontinental ballistic missile (ICBM); fully operational September 1957	R-7 Semyorka
1957 October 4	(Soviet Union) USSR	First artificial satellite First man-made signals from orbit	Sputnik 1
1957 November 3	(Soviet Union) USSR	First mammal (the dog Laika) in orbit around Earth.	Sputnik 2
1958 March 17	(United States) USA	First solar-powered satellite	Vanguard 1
1959 January 2	(Soviet Union) USSR	First lunar spacecraft (fly-by); First rocket engine restart in Earth orbit First spacecraft to leave Earth's orbit First spacecraft on an escape trajectory from Earth	Luna 1
1959 January 4	(Soviet Union) USSR	First spacecraft in heliocentric orbit	Luna 1
1959 February 28	(United States) USA	First satellite in a polar orbit	Discoverer 1
1959 August 7	(United States) USA	First photograph of Earth from orbit	Explorer 6
1959 September 14	(Soviet Union) USSR	First hard landing on another celestial body (the Moon)	Luna 2
1959 October 7	(Soviet Union) USSR	First three-axis stabilised spacecraft First photos of far side of the Moon, covering 70% of the surface invisible from Earth; First automated on board development of photographic film and conversion to radio signals First gravity assist ('sling shot'), returning the spacecraft to Earth to retrieve the photos	Luna 3

== 1960–1969 ==
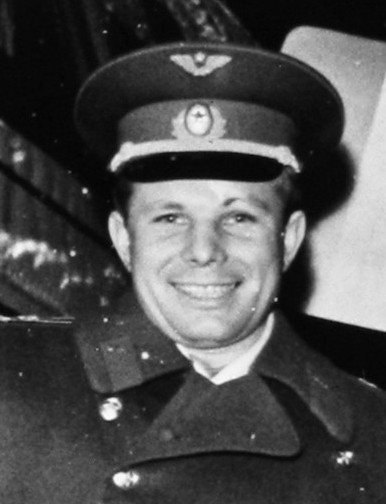
First human in space, Yuri Gagarin

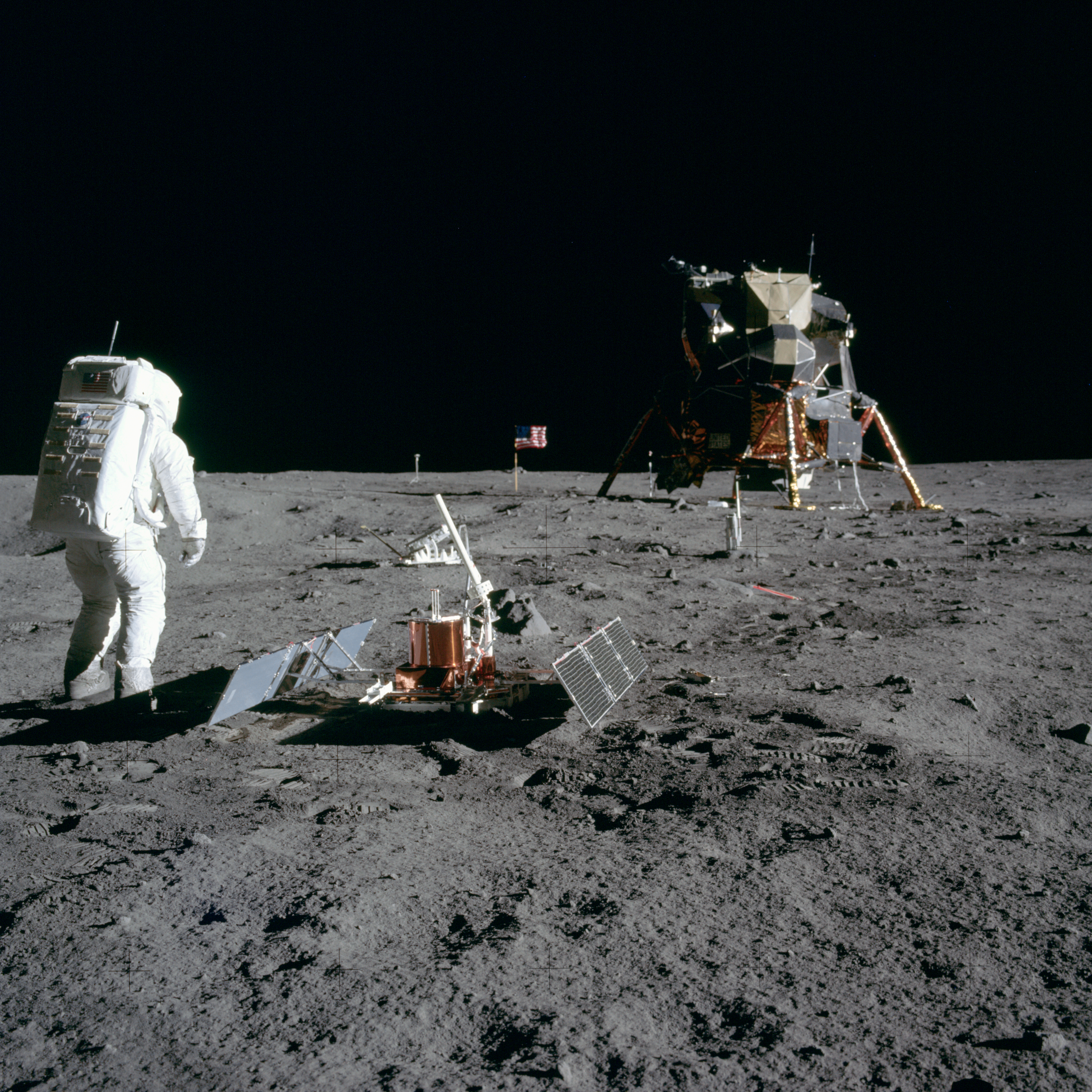
First humans on the Moon, Buzz Aldrin and Neil Armstrong (behind camera)

Date	Country	Achievement	Mission / Vehicle
1960 August 11	(United States) USA	First satellite recovered intact from orbit	Discoverer 13
1960 August 18	(United States) USA	First spy photography from space First aerial recovery of an object (the film) returning from Earth orbit	Discoverer 14
1960 August 19	(Soviet Union) USSR	First animals and plants returned alive from space (the dogs Belka and Strelka); First capsule recovered from orbit	Korabl-Sputnik 2 (aka Sputnik 5)
1961 January 31	(United States) USA	First great ape or Hominidae in space, Ham, a chimpanzee	Mercury-Redstone 2
1961 February 12	(Soviet Union) USSR	First launch from Earth orbit of upper stage into a heliocentric orbit First mid-course corrections First spin-stabilisation	Venera 1
1961 April 12	(Soviet Union) USSR	First human spaceflight mission (Yuri Gagarin); First orbital flight of a manned vehicle	Vostok 1
1961 May 5	(United States) USA	First pilot-controlled space flight (Alan Shepard)	Freedom 7
1961 May 19	(Soviet Union) USSR	First planetary flyby (Venus), although contact was lost	Venera 1
1961 August 6	(Soviet Union) USSR	First crewed mission lasting a full day (Gherman Titov).	Vostok 2
1962 August 12	(Soviet Union) USSR	First dual crewed spaceflight (Andriyan Nikolayev and Pavel Popovich); First spacecraft-to-spacecraft radio contact First simultaneous flight of crewed spacecraft. First person to float freely in microgravity.	Vostok 3 / Vostok 4
1962 December 14	(United States) USA	First successful planetary flyby mission (Venus).	Mariner 2
1963 June 16	(Soviet Union) USSR	First woman in space (Valentina Tereshkova); First civilian in space	Vostok 6
1963 June 19	(Soviet Union) USSR	First Mars flyby, although contact was lost	Mars 1
1963 July 19	(United States) USA	First reusable piloted spacecraft First spaceplane (suborbital)	X-15 Flight 90
1963 July 26	(United States) USA	First geosynchronous satellite	Syncom 2
1964 August 19	(United States) USA	First geostationary satellite	Syncom 3
1964 October 12	(Soviet Union) USSR	First spaceflight to carry more than one crewman into orbit (3)	Voskhod 1
1965 March 18	(Soviet Union) USSR	First extra-vehicular activity ("space walk")	Voskhod 2
1965 March 23	(United States) USA	First piloted spacecraft orbit change	Gemini 3
1965 July 14	(United States) USA	First successful Mars flyby mission	Mariner 4
1965 December 15	(United States) USA	First rendezvous of crewed spacecraft	Gemini 6A & Gemini 7
1966 February 3	(Soviet Union) USSR	First soft landing on another celestial body (the Moon); First photos from another celestial body	Luna 9
1966 March 1	(Soviet Union) USSR	First hard landing on another planet (Venus)	Venera 3
1966 March 16	(United States) USA	First spacecraft docking	Gemini 8 / ATV
1966 April 3	(Soviet Union) USSR	First artificial satellite to orbit another celestial body (the Moon)	Luna 10
1966 September 12	(United States) USA	First direct-ascent (first orbit) rendezvous	Gemini 11 / ATV
1967 October 18	(Soviet Union) USSR	First in situ analysis of the atmosphere of another planet (Venus)	Venera 4
1967 October 30	(Soviet Union) USSR	First docking of two remote-controlled spacecraft	Cosmos 186 / Cosmos 188
1968 September 14–21	(Soviet Union) USSR	First return to Earth after circling the Moon; First life forms to circle the Moon (returned safely)	Zond 5
1968 December 21	(United States) USA	First return to Earth after orbiting the Moon; First human spaceflight mission to enter the gravitational influence of another celestial body	Apollo 8
1969 January	(Soviet Union) USSR	First parachute to be deployed on another planet (Venus)	Venera 5
1969 January 16	(Soviet Union) USSR	First crew exchange in space First docking of two crewed spacecraft	Soyuz 4 / Soyuz 5
1969 July 20	(United States) USA	First humans on the Moon; First space launch from another celestial body First sample return from the Moon	Apollo 11
1969 November 19	(United States) USA	First precisely targeted piloted landing on the Moon (Surveyor 3 site)	Apollo 12

== 1970–1979 ==
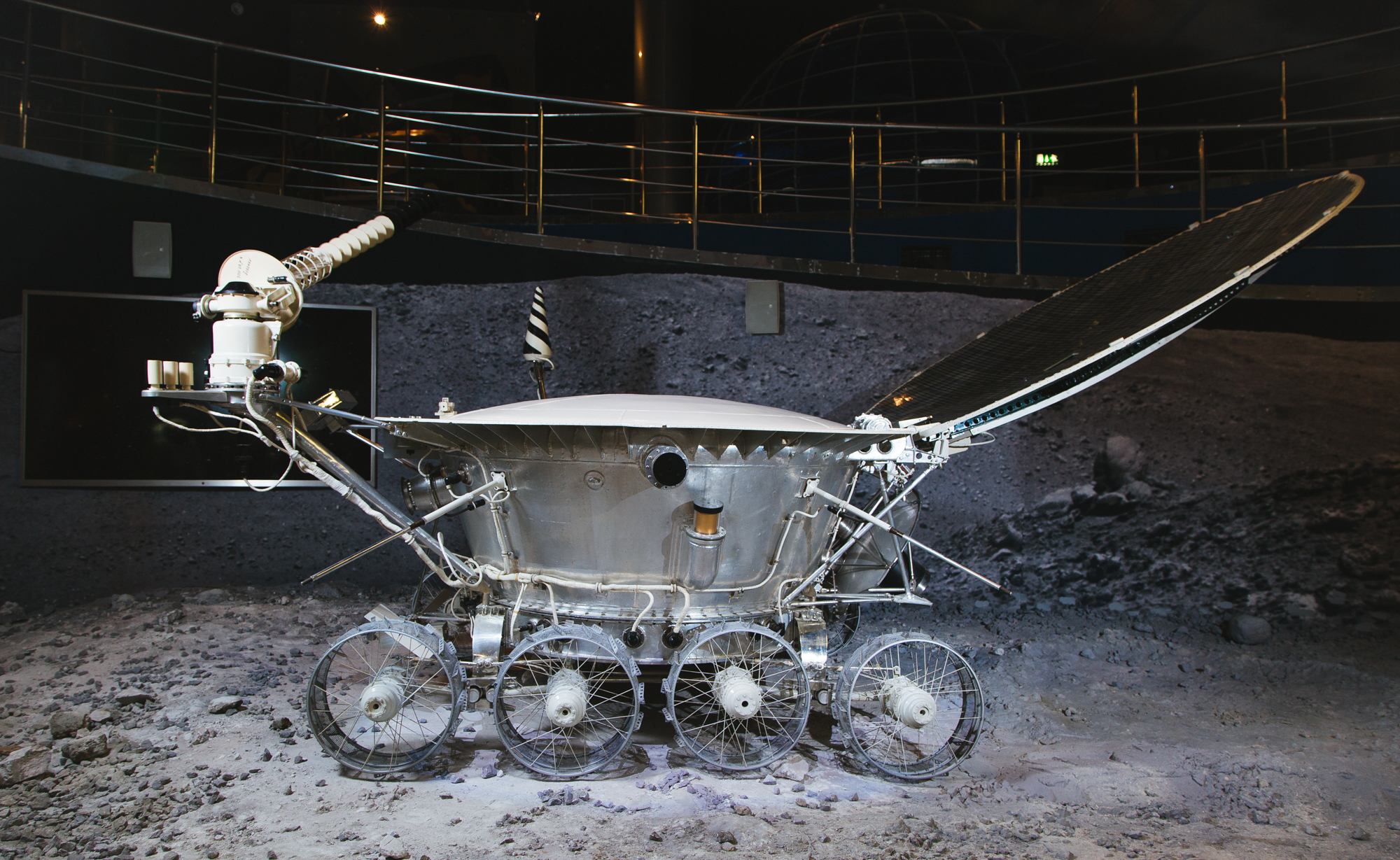
First lunar rover, Lunokhod 1

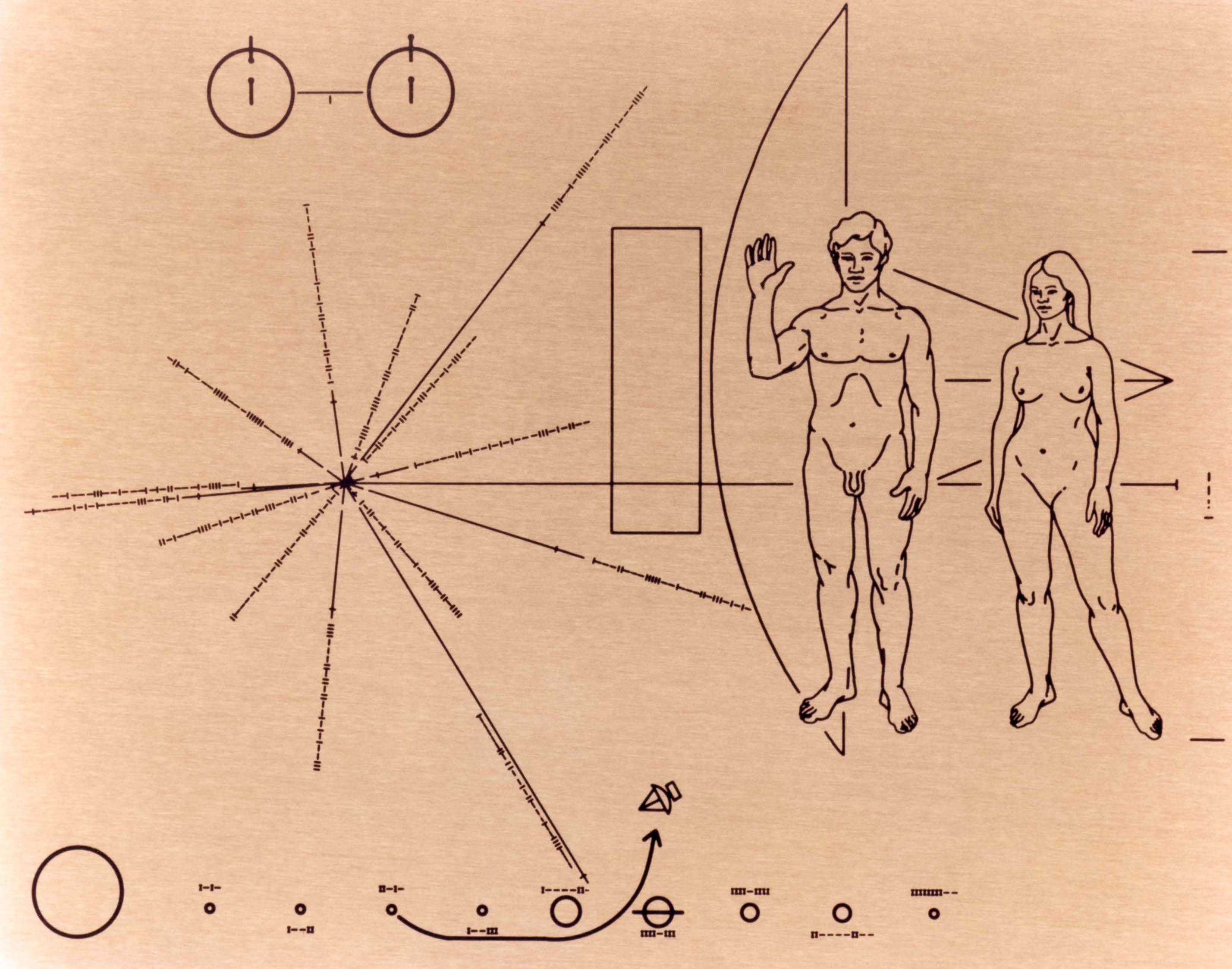
First spacecraft on an escape trajectory away from the Sun, Pioneer 10

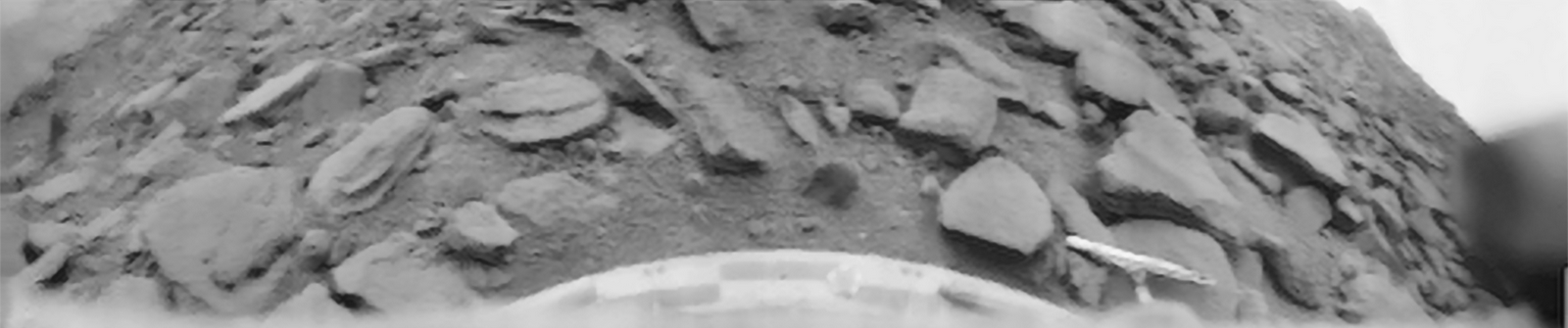
First view and clear photograph taken of and from the surface of Venus, Venera 9

Date	Country	Achievement	Mission / Vehicle
1970 September 24	(Soviet Union) USSR	First robotic automatic sample return from another celestial body (the Moon)	Luna 16
1970 November 23	(Soviet Union) USSR	First lunar rover (remote-controlled) First rover on another celestial body (the Moon)	Lunokhod 1
1970 December 15	(Soviet Union) USSR	First soft landing on another planet (Venus); First signals from another planet	Venera 7
1971 April 19	(Soviet Union) USSR	First human-crewed space station launched	Salyut 1
1971 June 29	(Soviet Union) USSR	First human-crewed orbital observatory (Orion 1)	Soyuz 11 / Salyut 1
1971 July 31	(United States) USA	First human-driven lunar rover, the Lunar Roving Vehicle	Apollo 15
1971 November 14	(United States) USA	First spacecraft to orbit Mars	Mariner 9
1971 November 27	(Soviet Union) USSR	First hard landing on Mars	Mars 2
1971 December 2	(Soviet Union) USSR	First soft Mars landing First signals from Mars surface	Mars 3
1972 March 3	(United States) USA	First spacecraft sent on escape trajectory away from the Sun	Pioneer 10
1972 July 15	(United States) USA	First mission to enter the asteroid belt and leave inner Solar System	Pioneer 10
1973 December 3	(United States) USA	First Jupiter flyby	Pioneer 10
1974 March 29	(United States) USA	First Mercury flyby	Mariner 10
1975 July 15	(Soviet Union) USSR (United States) USA	First multinational human-crewed mission (Note: After the first multinational crewed mission in July 1975, the competition continued to exist, but transitioned in intensity from a state of intense competition to one of cooperation by the dissolution of the Soviet Union and end of the Cold War on 26 December 1991.)	Soyuz 19; Apollo–Soyuz Test Project
1975 October 20	(Soviet Union) USSR	First spacecraft to orbit Venus (the orbiter); First view and clear photograph from and of the surface of another planet (the lander)	Venera 9
1979 September 1	(United States) USA	First Saturn flyby	Pioneer 11

== 1980–1990 ==
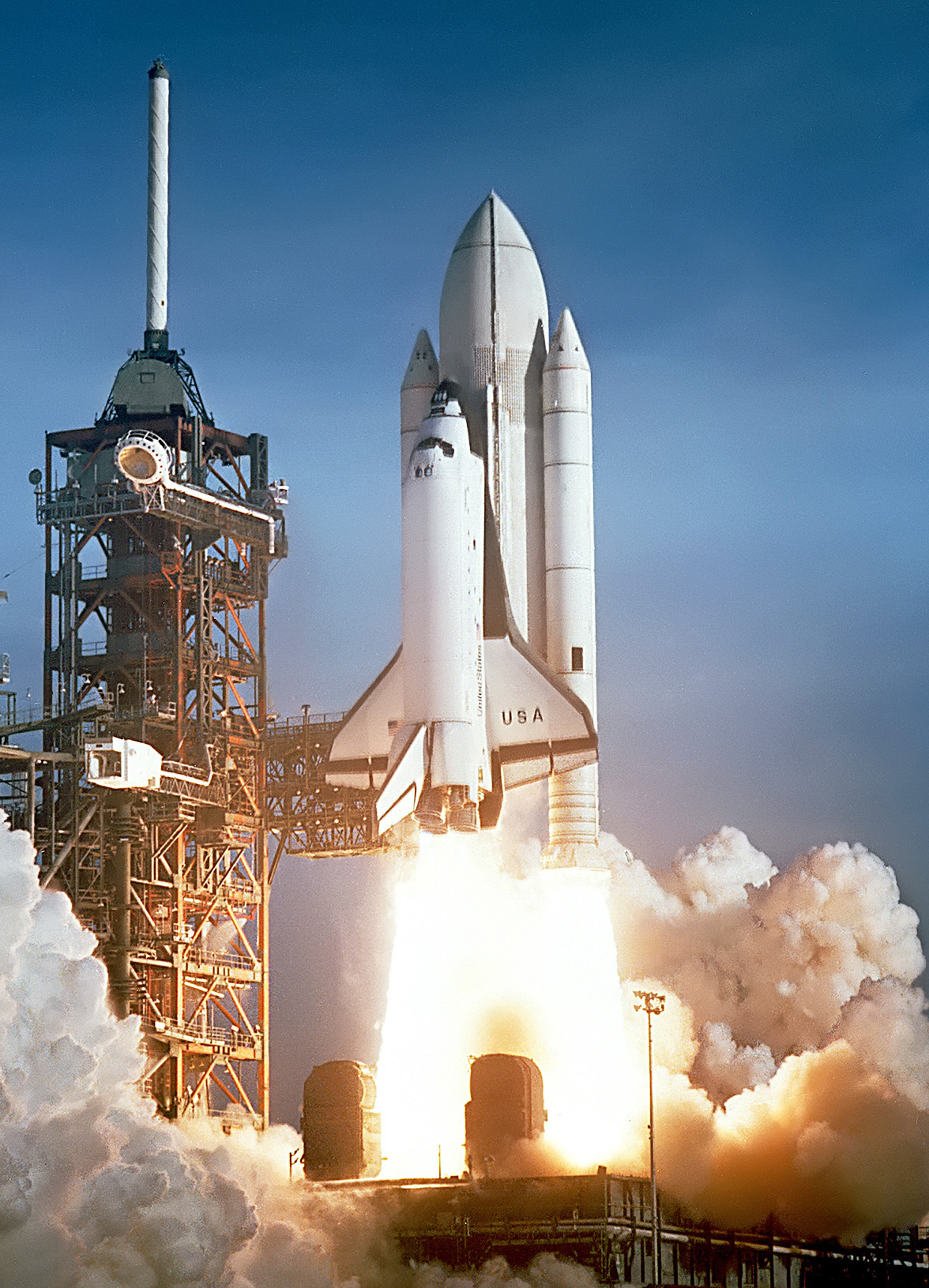
First Space Shuttle

Date	Country	Achievement	Mission / Vehicle
1981 April 12	(United States) USA	First spaceplane in orbit, the Space Shuttle (test flight)	STS-1
1984 February 7	(United States) USA	First untethered spacewalk, Bruce McCandless II	STS-41-B
1985 June 11	(Soviet Union) USSR	First aerostat balloon in the atmosphere of Venus	Vega 1 probe
1986 January 24	(United States) USA	First Uranus flyby	Voyager 2
1986 February 19	(Soviet Union) USSR	First module of the first modular space station launched, marking the start of the orbital assembly	Mir Core Module
1989 August 25	(United States) USA	First Neptune flyby	Voyager 2
1990 February 11	(Soviet Union) USSR	First consistently inhabited long-term research space station	Mir

On 1991 December 31, the United Nations accepted the dissolution of the USSR, which meant the end of the space race.

== See also ==
- List of communications satellite firsts
- List of space exploration milestones, 1957–1969
- Timeline of space exploration
- Timeline of first orbital launches by country
- Timeline of space travel by nationality
