= Phytochrome =

Protein used by plants, bacteria and fungi to detect light

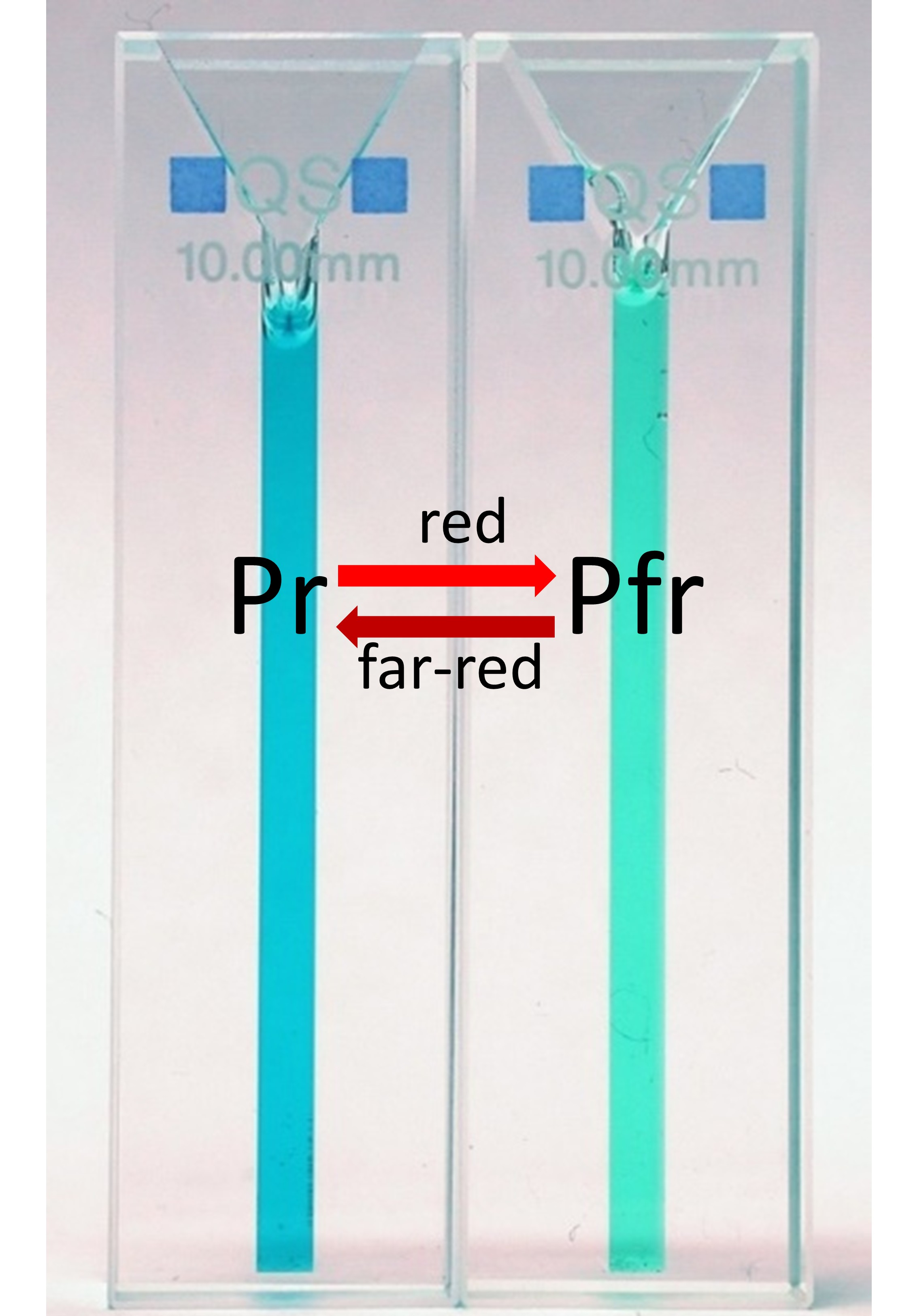
- Cph1 phytochrome from the cyanobacterium Synechocystis 6803; The Pr (red absorbing) and Pfr (far-red absorbing) states are interconverted by light. Here, highly concentrated recombinant Cph1 is shown following purification as Pr and Pfr.

Identifiers
- Symbol: Phytochrome
- InterPro: Q55168
Available protein structures:
- PDB: 2vea Q55168
- AlphaFold: Q55168

Phytochromes are a class of photoreceptor proteins found in plants as well as certain fungi and bacteria. Characteristically they use bile pigments to absorb light in the red to far-red region of the spectrum, changing their colour as they do so (see Fig. 1).

Phytochromes control many aspects of plant development, inducing seed germination, seedling development (see Fig. 2), shade avoidance and daylength-dependent flowering by regulating the expression of thousands of genes through the action of phytochrome-associated transcription factors. Higher plant genomes encode several phytochromes with significantly different characteristics and functions. Other plant photoreceptors include cryptochromes and phototropins, which respond to blue and near ultraviolet (UV-A) light, and UVR8, which responds to ultraviolet-B light.

Phytochromes have been identified in certain fungi and shown to regulate pigmentation and sexual development. Prokaryotic phytochromes regulate very diverse processes including pigment accumulation and fruiting-body assembly.

The mechanism by which the phytochrome molecule itself is activated by light and how it then transmits the light signal to the cell are a major research fields in molecular biology. There is also interest in the possibility of exploiting these processes in biotechnology and other areas.

== Discovery ==
Phytochrome discovery was not a single event: rather, its existence was inferred gradually from diverse experiments. Between 1920 and 1940, it was found that flowering in many plants, including important crops, was controlled by daylength and that light also regulated seed germination. Both these responses were stimulated and inhibited by red and far-red (near infra-red) light, respectively, prompting Harry Borthwick to propose in 1952 that one and the same pigment was involved: this had the character of an optical switch that is preferentially activated by red light, but at the same time changes its properties to absorb far-red light and is thereby de-activated. In 1959 Warren Butler was able to demonstrate the predicted red/far-red (R/FR) reversible colour change (see Fig. 1) and also introduced the name "phytochrome". Pure preparations of intact phytochrome from oat were first described in 1983, the corresponding PHYA gene was cloned and sequenced soon afterwards. Prokaryotic phytochromes were first described in 1997. A more detailed description of phytochrome research is given in the final "Historical aspects" section.

== Physiology in plants ==
Until about 1990, phytochrome research was focused on plants. Plant phytochromes in dark-grown seedlings are present in their lowest-energy, physiologically inactive, red-light-absorbing state (hence "Pr") with absorbance maximum (λ_{max}) at 665 nm. In light, Pr is converted to the physiologically active state that absorbs predominantly in the far-red region (hence "Pfr") with λ_{max} at 730 nm. Whereas Pr is restricted to the cytoplasm, Pfr is translocated into the nucleus where it binds members of the phytochrome interacting factor (PIF) family. PIFs are dark-acting basic helix-loop-helix transcription factors that bind CACGTG ("G-box") sequences typically found in the promoters of light-regulated genes. In darkness, the products of many of these genes lead to skotomorphogenesis, the etiolated developmental form of seedlings grown in darkness, for example through enhanced production of phytohormones such as auxin that enhance stem extension (see Fig. 2). Pfr binding, however, leads to rapid dissociation from the promoter and proteolysis. This proteolysis is induced by physical binding of the PIF and Mut9-like kinases (MLKs, also known as photoregulatory protein kinases or PPKs) to Pfr, leading to phosphorylation of both PIF and phytochrome at numerous sites, marking them for ubiquitination and subsequent "mutually-assured destruction" in the proteosome. PIF-mediated etiolation is thereby interrupted and photomorphogenesis allowed to proceed (see Fig. 2). Almost a quarter of the gene complement in Arabidopsis is either up- or downregulated at least 3-fold following exposure to light through the action of Pfr.

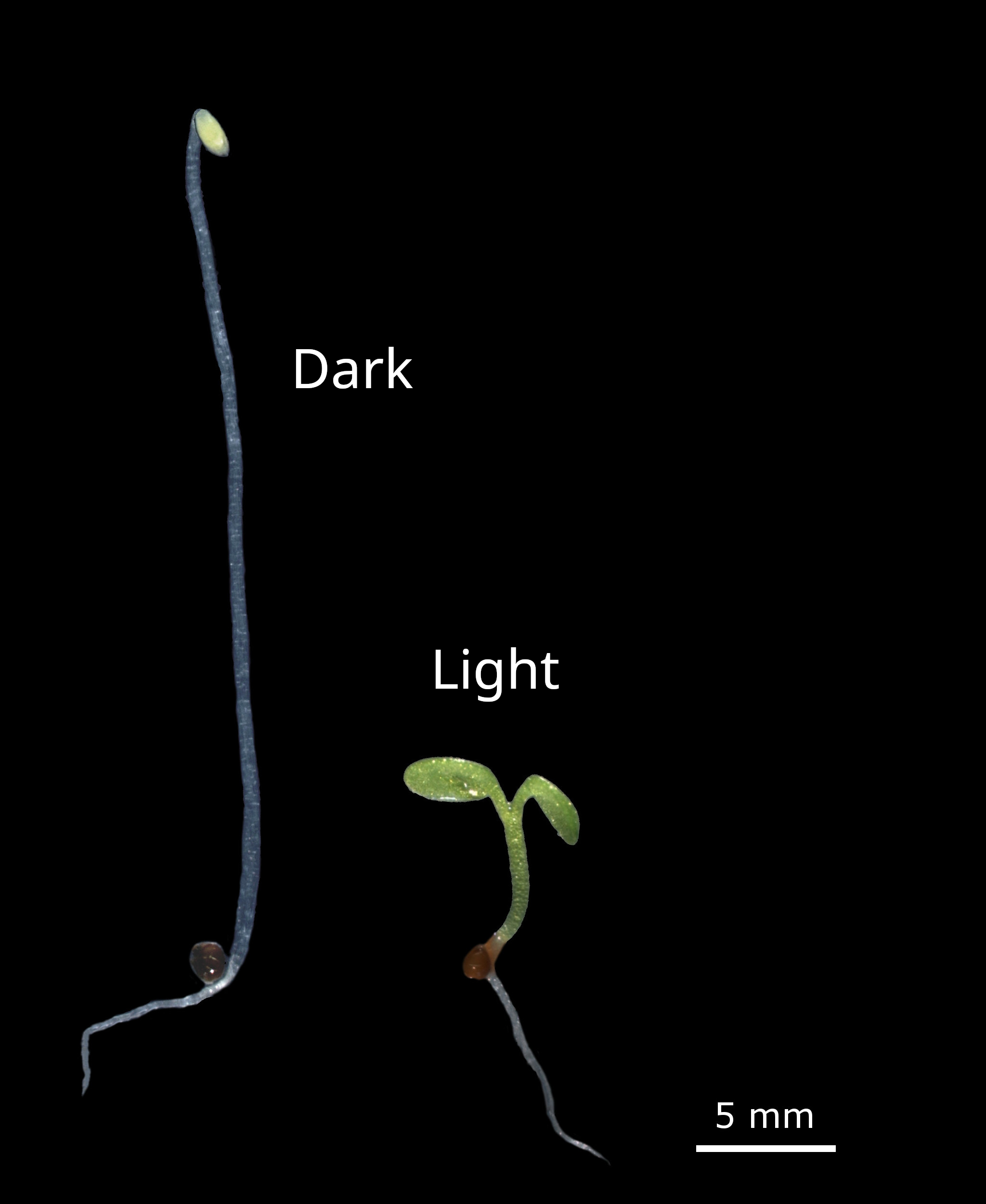
Figure 2. Arabidopsis seedlings grown in darkness (left) and light (right).

The description above is oversimplified, however, as higher plants possess several different phytochromes, each with rather different characteristics and modes of action. In particular, whereas phyB is present at very low but fairly constant levels in the cell, phyA accumulates to much higher levels in darkness and thus predominates in de-etiolation (greening) of dark-grown seedlings when exposed to light (see Fig. 2). With the formation of Pfr in the light, the PHYA gene itself is strongly repressed and phyA Pfr efficiently eliminated proteolytically. In the meantime, however, phyA Pfr is able to signal the presence of exceedingly low light levels to the cell, in part because more Pfr molecules are formed from the relatively large amount of phyA Pr initially present. But phytochromes are dimeric (comprising two protomer molecules bound strongly together), thus in light Pr|Pfr heterodimers are first formed: these are responsible for the very low fluence response (VLFR). The role of PIFs and perhaps other partners in phyA signalling is much less well understood than in the case of phyB. Indeed, whereas phyB Pfr binds all six PIFs in Arabidopsis, phyA Pfr binds only PIF1 and PIF3. Moreover, the binding sites on the PIFs are different for phyA and phyB. Additionally, transcriptional regulation by the HY5/SPA1/COP1 system regulates photomorphogenesis via Pfr of both phyA and phyB.

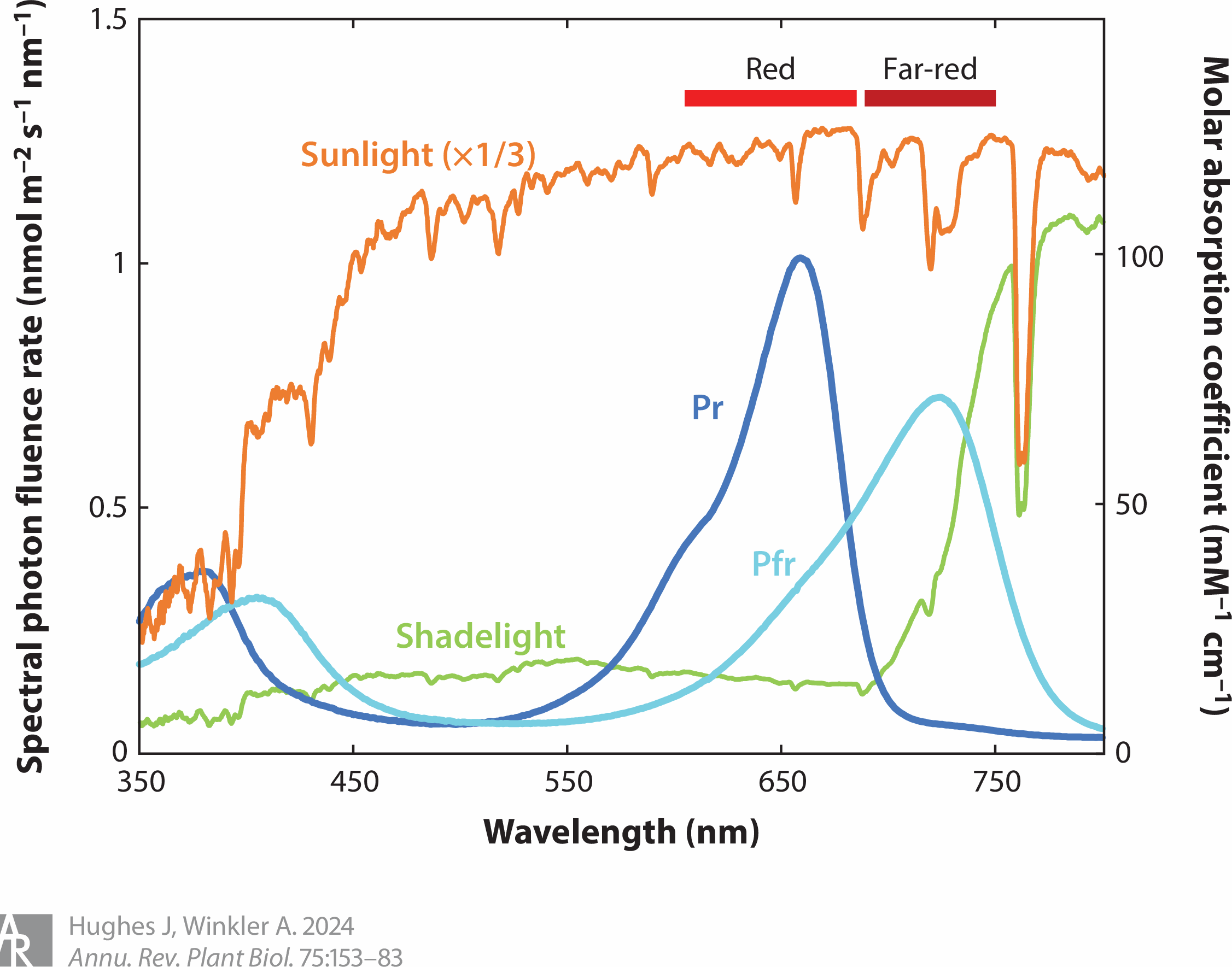
Figure 3. Spectra of natural daylight and absorption by phytochrome Typical day- (orange) and shade- (green) light in the natural environment with absorbance spectra of Sorghum phytochrome B produced as a PΦB adduct in E. coli and finally purified chromatographically; Pr (blue) and Pfr (cyan). The Pfr spectrum was derived from that of the Pr|Pfr photoequilbrium mixture at 650 nm assuming 88% Pfr

The characteristic R/FR photochromicity of phytochromes is itself important in the biological function of phyB. The Pr and Pfr absorption wavelengths coincide with spectral changes in natural daylight associated with leafy shade (see Fig. 3). The R/FR ratio of unfiltered sunlight is quite constant, even during twilight, but is reduced strongly by the absorption of red light by chlorophyll-bearing leaves. This changes the photoequilibrium established between Pr and Pfr, providing the plant with potentially useful information regarding the presence of competitors, probably the selective advantage associated with R/FR photoreversible induction of seed germination: such phyB-mediated effects are collectively termed low fluence responses (LFR).

Although various plant species adapted to life in shaded habitats are scarcely affected by depressed R/FR ratios, seedlings of ruderal species react dramatically by promoting stem extension in order to raise their leaves above those of the perceived competitor: this shade avoidance response is mediated by phyB, primarily through its interaction with PIF4. For example, Chenopodium album grows as a strong, stocky plant in exposed (unshaded) conditions, but in sugar beet fields it develops monopodially to outgrow the encroaching competitors, emerging above them to form a large, leafy crown that finally sheds thousands of seeds.

A further effect of phyA is the so-called high irradiance response (HIR) in dark-grown seedlings. Although the photoreceptor is activated by red light, hypocotyl elongation is suppressed much more strongly in continuous 710 nm light, between the Pr and Pfr absorbance maxima at 665 and 730 nm, respectively. This results principally from a balance struck over time between suppression of elongation by Pfr and the simultaneous loss of Pfr through its proteolytic destruction. However, light conditions in the natural environment are seldom appropriate to support HIR-like effects for more than an hour, thus it is questionable whether the HIR is important outside the laboratory.

Another difference between phyA and phyB concerns their localisation in the cell. All plant phytochromes are considered to be cytosolic as Pr. When phyA Pr is photoconverted to Pfr it binds the FHY1 adapter protein and is thereby translocated into the nucleus by importin-α. FHY1 is required although phyA proteins themselves carry a nuclear-localisation sequence (NLS). Conversely, no canonical NLS is present in phyB yet it does not require FHY1 for nuclear import. How a protein as bulky as phyB can enter the nucleus is thus unclear. Indeed, whether phyB nuclear import requires Pfr formation at all has been called into question (see).

== Physiology in fungi and bacteria ==
Up to the 1990s phytochrome photoreceptors were generally considered to be restricted to the plant kingdom. In fact, however, Guy Valadon and colleagues at the University of London provided convincing evidence around 1980 that phytochrome regulated the biosynthesis of carotenoid pigments in the fungal genus Verticillium. More recently, pigmentation and sexual development in the fungus Aspergillis nidulans has also been shown to be regulated by phytochrome.

In 1995, a gene (slr0473) in the cyanobacterium Synechocystis 6803 was noticed that encoded a protein with sequence similarity to a moss phytochrome. Moreover, when expressed in E. coli, the product spontaneously attached bilin cofactors to form a R/FR photochromic holoprotein, proving it to be a bona fide phytochrome. R/FR-reversible histidine kinase activity was also shown, in harmony with C-terminal sequence similarity to kinases in "two-component" signalling systems widespread in prokaryotes. However, in contrast to plant phytochromes in which Pfr is the signalling state, kinase activity of Cph1 was found to be associated with Pr rather than Pfr. No physiological function is known to be associated with this prototypical cyanobacterial phytochrome, Cph1. It is generally assumed, however, that early endosymbiotic cyanobacteria introduced phytochrome-encoding genes to the organisms that evolved into plants. The discovery of Cph1 was followed by that of DrBphP, a more primitive bacteriophytochrome in the non-photosynthetic bacterium Deinococcus radiodurans. Although DrBphP was assumed to be a histidine kinase, such activity was not demonstrated. More recently it has been shown that it is instead a phosphatase. DrBphP was reported to regulate carotenoid biosynthesis but this has not been confirmed. Bacteriophytochromes in the plant pathogens Pseudomonas syringae and Agrobacterium fabrum are thought to regulate pathogenicity. Fruiting body formation is controlled by bacteriophytochromes in Stigmatella aurantiaca and several other myxococcal bacteria. The photosynthetic system of Rhodopseudomonas palustris is also thought to be regulated by bacteriophytochrome.

Whereas canonical phytochromes carry a histidine kinase-like C-terminal module, in bacterial PadC photoreceptors this module is replaced by a diguanylate cyclase moeity regulated by a bacteriophytochrome-typical photosensory module. Cyclic-dimeric-GMP is a widely-used "second messenger" in bacteria, regulating diverse responses commonly related to stress.

== Molecular structure and function ==
Phytochromes form stable dimers, each protomer comprising a ca. 125 and 85 kDa (ca. 1140 and 750 amino acid) polypeptide in plant- and prokaryotic types, respectively. Understanding of phytochrome molecular function improved greatly following the discovery of prokaryotic phytochromes, not only because samples were easy to prepare using recombinant genetic methods in transgenic E. coli but also because the underlying domain structure of the phytochrome family became clear through comparison with other prokaryotic sequences, providing a guide to likely molecular functions.

=== Domain structure ===
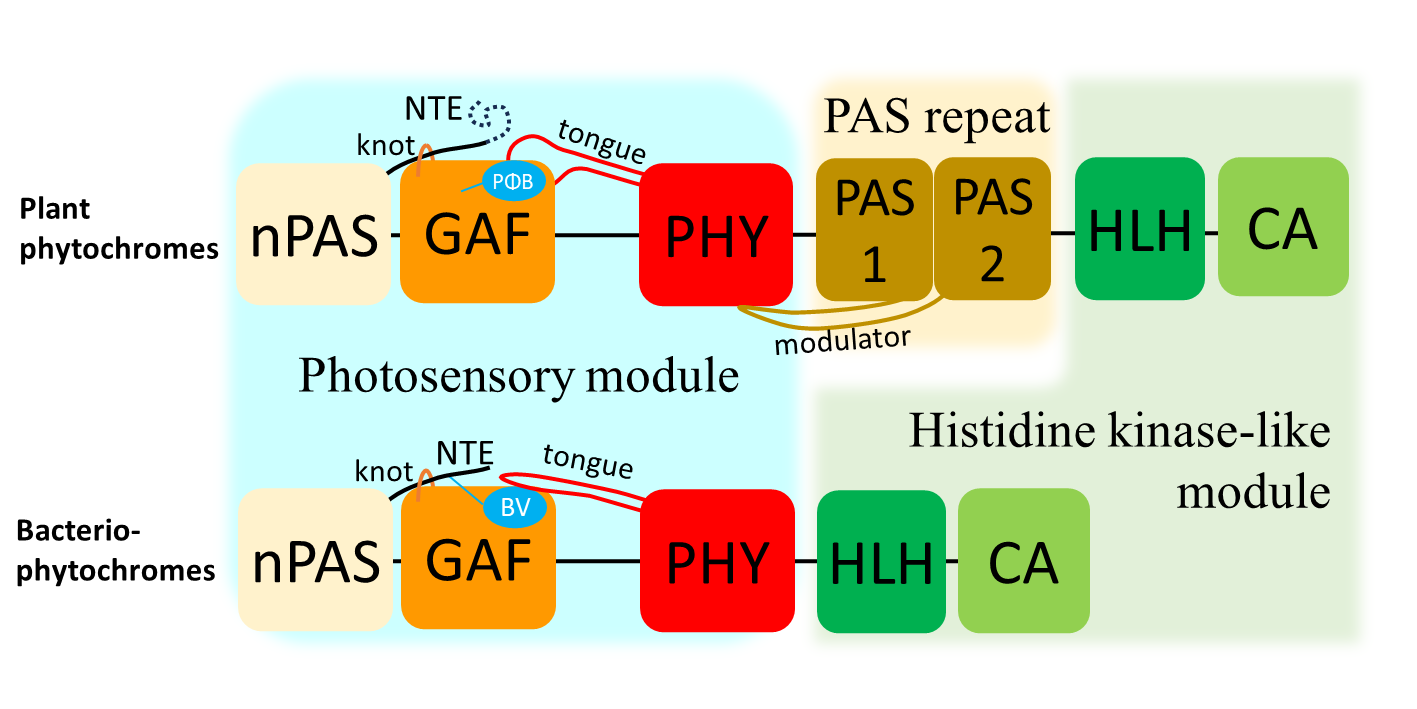
Figure 4. Plant phytochrome and bacteriophytochrome domain maps. NTE N-terminal extension nPAS N-terminal Per/ARNT/Sim domain GAF cGMP-specific phosphodiesterases/adenylyl cyclases/Fhl domain PHY Phytochrome-specific domain PAS1/2 Per/ARNT/Sim domains 1 and 2 HLH Helix-loop-helix domain CA Catalytic ATPase-related domain The chromophores and linkages (cyan) as well as the loops associated with the knot, the tongue and the modulator are also shown.

Phytochrome protomers comprise several well-defined domains (see Fig. 4).

The N-terminal photosensory module comprises ca. 520 amino acids folding to form three domains (nPAS, GAF and PHY), all of which are related to the PAS domain archetype (essentially a baseball glove-like structure with five or six antiparallel β-sheets enclosed by several α-helices on each side). The central GAF domain contains the bilin (linear tetrapyrrole) chromophore responsible for light absorption. N-terminal extensions (NTEs) of 20 to 120 amino acids precede the nPAS domain.

The C-terminal ca. 220 amino acids of canonical phytochromes comprise the histidine kinase-like module, so called because of its similarity to the C-terminus of sensory histidine protein kinases involved in two component regulatory systems in bacteria. Characteristically, these comprise a helix-loop-helix domain (HLH, also called the dimerisation and histidine phosphotransfer domain or DHp) connected via a flexible linker to a catalytic ATPase-related domain (CA). In Cph1, autophosphorylation and phosphotransfer to the Rcp1 response regulator has been shown: in contrast to plant phytochromes, the physiologically active state in prokaryotic phytochromes is always Pr rather than Pfr. Although histidine kinase activity was assumed in a bacteriophytochrome from Deinococcus radiodurans too, recent work has shown it instead to have phosphatase (dephosphorylation) activity. Whereas plant phytochromes show similar sequences in this region, the essential histidine acceptor is often missing, so, despite the likely evolutionary relationship, they cannot act in this manner. Indeed, beyond dimerisation, the role of the histidine kinase-like module is poorly understood.

Plant phytochromes characteristically include an additional ca. 270 amino acid PAS repeat module between the photosensory and histidine-kinase-like modules. A short sequence with particular importance in signalling was identified between the two PAS domains through mutational studies.

=== Chromophore and photoconversion ===
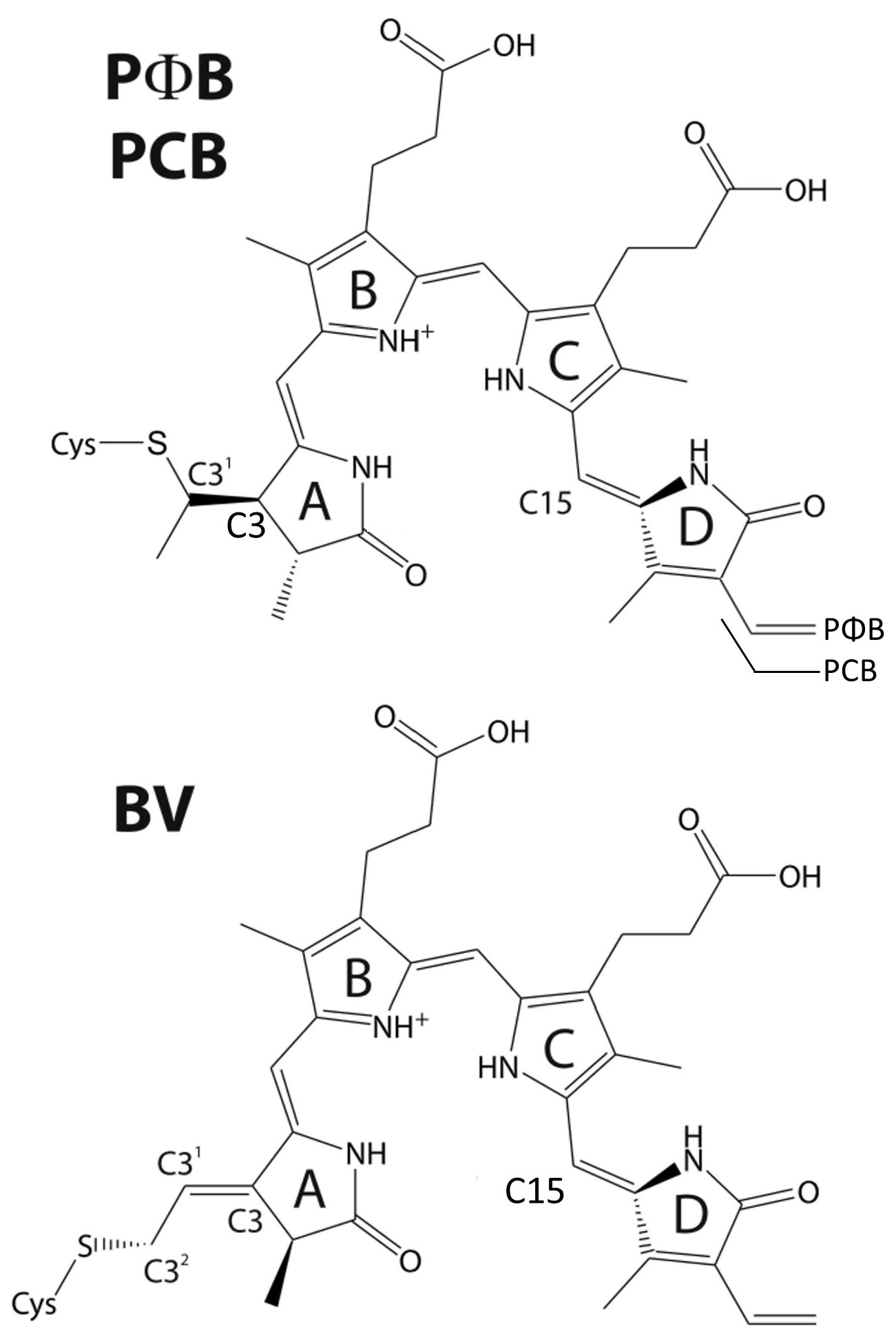
Figure 5. Phytochrome chromophores as Pr (ZZZssa). Upon photoconversion to Pfr, the double bond at C15 isomerises, the D-ring flipping over, yielding ZZEssa geometry.

Phytochromes absorb light through their bilin (linear tetrapyrrole) chromophore (see Fig. 5). In Cph1-like and plant phytochromes this is phycocyanobilin (PCB) and phytochromobilin (PΦB), respectively, linked covalently via a thioether to a conserved cysteine residue of the GAF domain. In bacteriophytochromes, however, the chromophore is biliverdin (BV), attached via a longer linker to a cysteine near the N-terminus. Autocatalytic covalent attachment of the chromophore is characteristic of the phytochrome family. Befitting a photoreceptor, the phytochrome chromophore absorbs light exceedingly efficiently, showing an extinction coefficient of about 100 mM^{-1} cm^{-1} (10,000-fold greater than that of Cu(SO_{4})_{2} in solution). Ring geometry is ZZZssa in the Pr state, whereas in Pfr the double bond at C15 isomerises and the D-ring flips over, yielding ZZEssa. How this leads to the phytochrome-characteristic changes in the absorption spectrum is not yet understood.

Both Pr and Pfr are in the S_{0} quantum mechanical ground state, but because of its slightly higher energetic level, Pfr reverts slowly to Pr in darkness (although in "bathy"-type bacteriophytochromes such as PaBphP and Agp2, Pfr is the lowest energy state). Photon absorption by the Pr chromophore induces the S_{1} excited state with an unusually long half-life of about 30 ps. From S_{1}, the chromophore can either relax thermally (or via fluorescence) back to the Pr ground state, or it can isomerise to form the lumi-R intermediate via the conical intersection between the S_{1} and S_{0} surfaces. lumi-R is a short-lived S_{0} state in which the D-ring has already isomerised as a result of the lowered bond-order and likely Coulombic forces associated with the excited state. In contrast to the extinction coefficient, photoisomerisation is rather inefficient, less than 15% of the S_{1} molecules yielding lumi-R, in correlation with their longevity. Interactions between the lumi-R chromophore and the protein in the following milliseconds generate at least two intermediates, meta-Ra and meta-Rc. In the process, two protons are ejected from the protein, one of which is reabsorbed upon Pfr formation. Photoconversion of Pfr back to Pr is less well understood but is probably quite different from the forward reaction.

Starting from Pr in solution, light of any wavelength between about 350 and 710 nm (UV/A to deep red) generates Pfr. That itself can be photoconverted back to Pr by the same wavelength because the Pfr absorption spectrum overlaps with that of Pr throughout (see Fig. 3). Therefore, over a period of time, light generates a photoequilibrium between Pr and Pfr: in Cph1 and plant phytochromes, the proportion of Pfr is maximal (ca. 80%) in orange-red light but only about 50% in natural daylight with similar levels of red and far-red light. Under leafy canopies where far-red light predominates, the proportion is lower and in extreme cases can fall below 10%.

=== 3D structure ===
Although the sequences of plant and prokaryotic phytochromes show limited similarity, the 3D structures of the photosensory and histidine kinase-like modules are strongly conserved.

3D crystal structures of the photosensory module

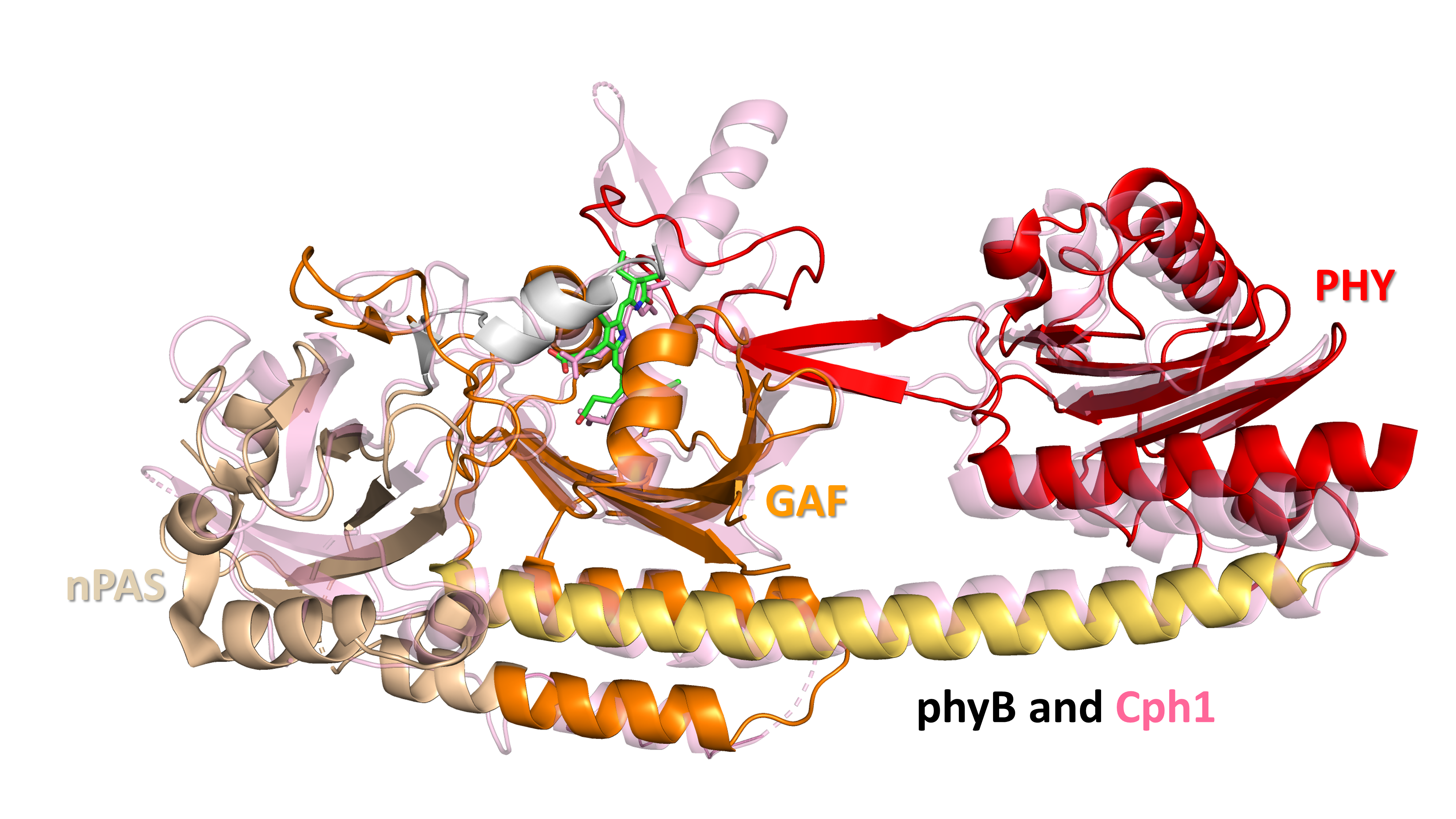
Figure 6. Soybean phyB (PDB 6tl4) photosensory module in the Pr state superimposed with Cph1 (pink, PDB 2vea) .
The phyB NTE, nPAS, GAF and PHY domains are coloured grey, wheat, gold and red, respectively. A long helix (below, yellow) connects GAF to PHY, while a tongue-like hairpin loop of the PHY domain reaches back to contact the GAF domain near the chromophore (green; see close-up in Fig. 7).

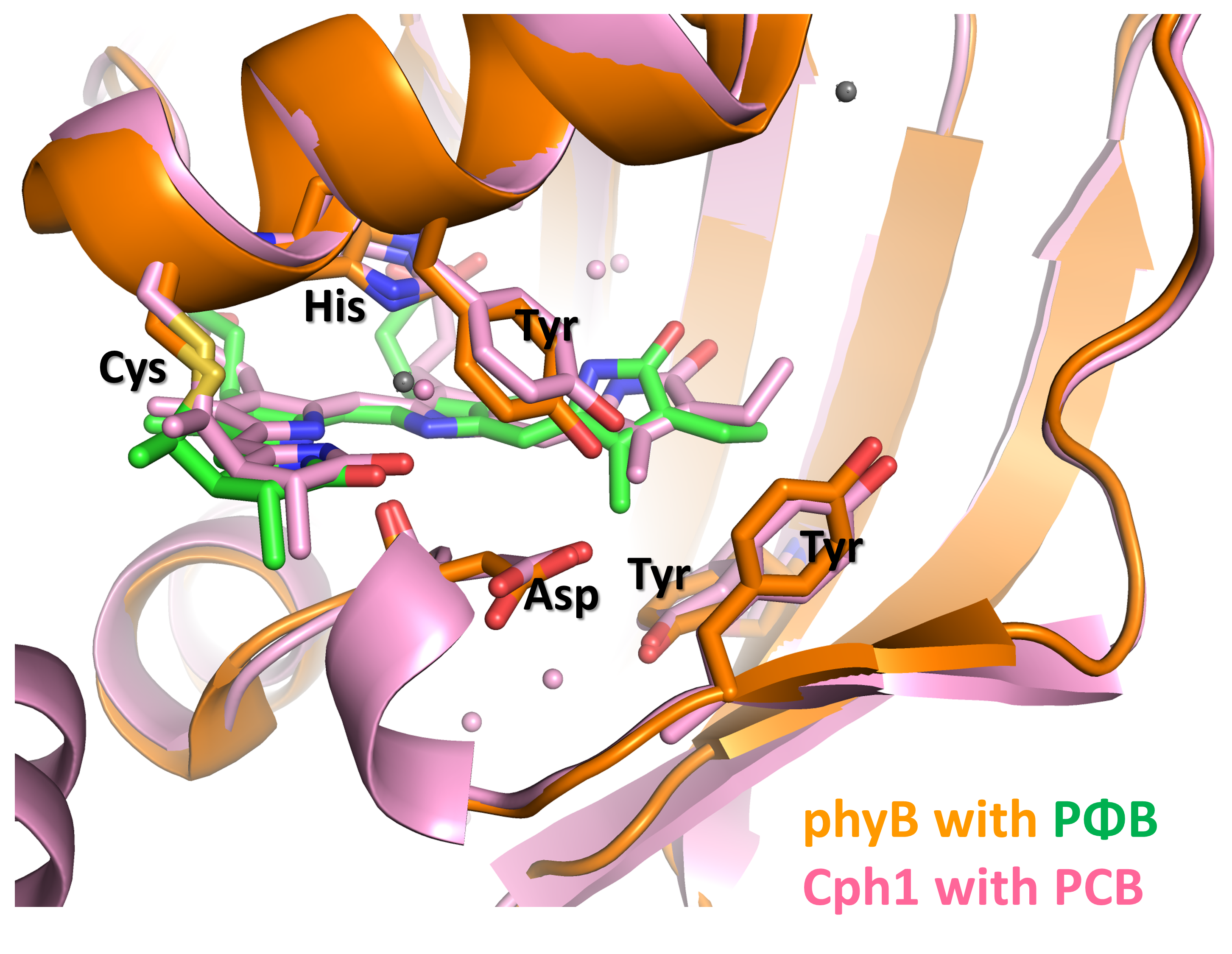
Figure 7. Close-up of the GAF domain chromophore region of Soybean phyB (protein gold, chromophore green) in the Pr state superimposed with Cph1 (pink).
Nitrogen, oxygen and sulphur atoms are shown in blue, red and yellow, respectively. Important amino acid side chains are labelled. Note the baseball glove-like structure formed by the β-sheets in the background.

A 3D superimposition of the plant phyB and Cph1 photosensory modules as Pr is shown in Fig. 6. In particular, the NTE passes through a loop of the GAF domain to form a figure-of-eight knot around the nPAS domain, a very unusual feature typical of the phytochrome family. The long helix connecting GAF and PHY domains and the tongue-like hairpin extension of the PHY domain reaching back to make contact with the GAF domain are also seen in all known phytochrome structures. Pr→Pfr photoconversion is associated with a radical refolding and shortening of the tongue, leading to a shift in the position of the PHY domain. Fig. 7 shows the chromophore pocket in atomic detail. The positions of the bilin, its cysteine linker, the "pyrrole water" above the A-C ring nitrogens with neighbouring histidine and aspartic acid residues as well as a trio of tyrosine residues attending ring D are closely similar.

The C-terminal histidine kinase-like module is also structurally conserved, although the position of the CA domain is variable, associated with mobility afforded by its flexible linker. At least in prokaryotic phytochromes, access of the CA domain to a conserved histidine residue of the HLH domain is probably regulated by shifts associated with PHY domain movements during photoconversion. Thus in the Pr state, the CA domain can transfer the terminal phosphate of its bound ATP to the target histidine that, in turn, phosphorylates a conserved aspartic acid residue of the response regulator partner protein, thereby controlling its signalling activity. The role of the CA domain in plant phytochromes is not known.

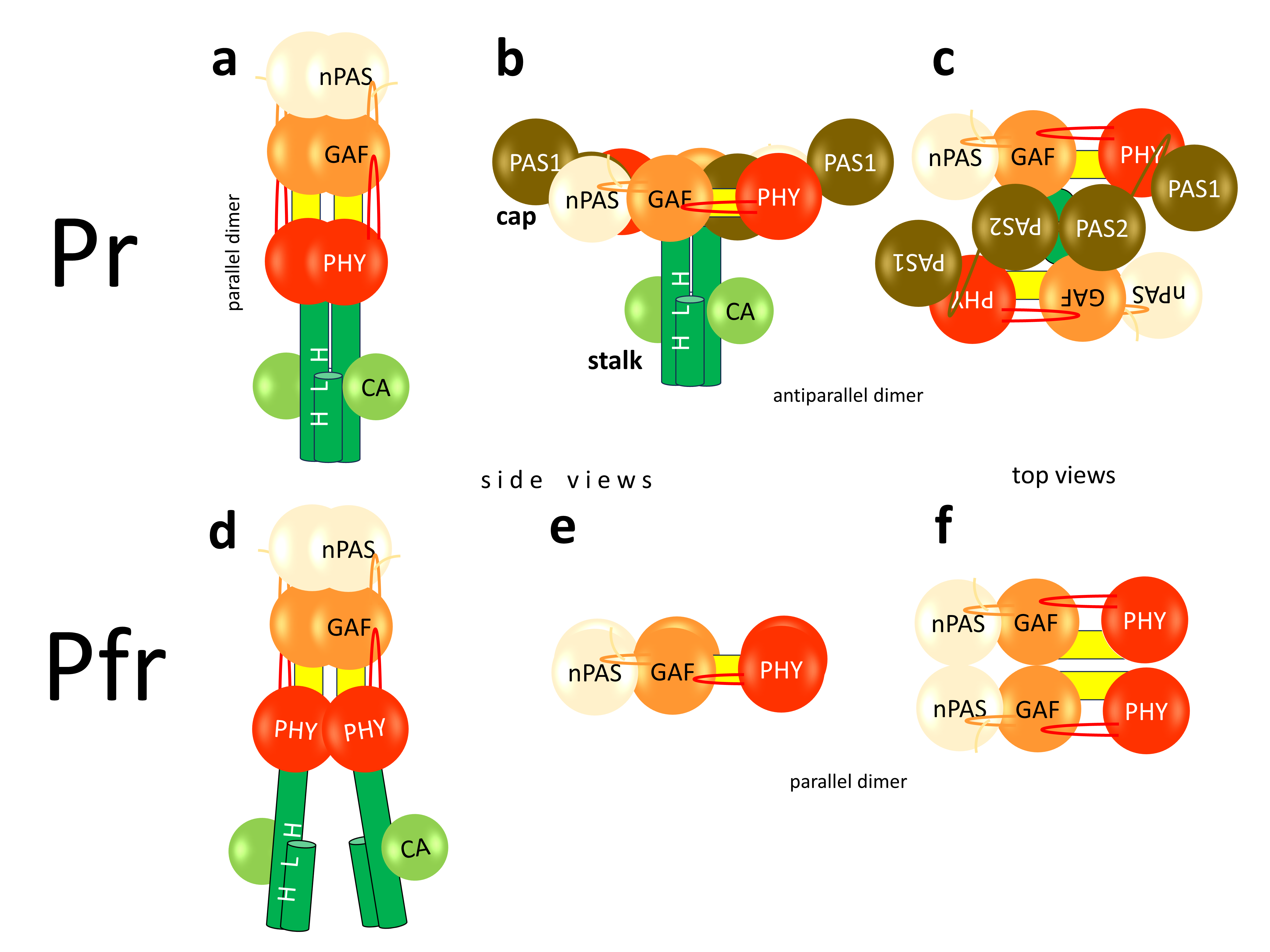
Figure 8. Diagrammatic domain architectures of phytochromes a-c Pr and d-f Pfr states; a / d, prokaryotic phytochromes (side views); b & c / e & f, plant phytochromes (side & top views). Only the structure of the photosensory module is known for plant Pfr: the PAS repeat and HKL modules were not resolved. The gold, red and brown hairpins represent the loops that form the knot, tongue and modulator, respectively.

However, despite the similarities of the domains themselves, the architectures of prokaryotic and plant phytochromes contrast dramatically.

In prokaryotic phytochromes the protomers form more or less linear, head-to-head dimers as in other two-component sensory systems. In Pr, the helices of the HLH domains form a compact unit (see Fig. 8a), whereas in Pfr, the tongue refolds, pulling on the PHY domains, thereby affecting the structure and function of the associated histidine kinase signalling module (Fig. 8d).

Figure 9. 3D structure of plant phytochrome A as PrThis video shows the near-complete 3D structure of recombinant Arabidopsis phytochrome A as a dimer in the Pr state, based on the cryoEM data of Burgie et al. (2023; PDB code 8F5Z) and visualised using PyMol (kindly provided by Schrödinger Inc.). It starts with the view from above the "landing platform" as in Fig. 8c, then rotates around two axes to show the mushroom-like platform and the stalk. The domains are coloured as follows: nPAS, wheat; GAF, gold; PHY, red; connecting helix, yellow; PAS2, light orange; HLH, green; CA, pink. The NTE and PAS1 are missing because of their high mobility.

In plant phytochromes as Pr, the HLH domains form a similar head-to-head unit, but, by contrast, the photosensory and PAS-repeat modules form a head-to-tail dimer, a cruciate structure connecting them to the HLH. The molecular dimer thus resembles a mushroom (Fig. 8b), with the photosensory and PAS-repeat modules forming a platform-like cap and the histidine kinase-like modules forming the stalk (e.g. PDB 8f5z; see Figs. 8b, 8c & 9, also). A loop connecting the paired PAS domains reaches back to make contact with the PHY domain: this "modulator" corresponds to a region identified genetically to be important in signalling. Although PAS domains are commonly associated with ligand binding and protein-protein interaction, the exact function of the PAS repeat is uncertain. It is clear, however, that the photosensory and PAS repeat modules are responsible for different partner interactions associated with signalling in plant phytochromes. Quite unexpectedly, recent work describing the 3D structure of plant phyB Pfr in complex with a fragment of its PIF6 signalling partner (PDB 8yb4 and 9jlb) shows the photosensory module as a head-to-head dimer (see Figs. 8e and 8f; none of the other domains could be resolved), in contrast to the head-to-tail architecture in Pr. How the apparent Pr↔Pfr re-modelling is brought about is not known.

=== Signalling ===
Canonical prokaryotic phytochromes signal as Pr by activating the C-terminal catalytic module that de/phosphorylates the cognate response regulator, thereby regulating its activity (see also). This is achieved by state-dependent refolding of the tongue-like hairpin connecting the PHY domain to the GAF. Shortening of the tongue in Pfr pulls on the PHY domains in the dimer, inducing subtle structural changes in the HLH domain that regulate access to the histidine target, probably affecting phosphotransfer of both the CA domain and the response regulator.

Signalling in plant phytochromes is quite different, deriving from Pfr-dependent interactions between the N-terminal photosensory module and probably the PAS repeat with various autonomous partner proteins (in the case of phyA including FHY1 adapter proteins required for nuclear translocation). Nuclear Pfr binds in particular members of the PIF transcription factor and MLK kinase families, resulting in the rapid phosphorylation of both the PIF and the phytochrome, thereby targeting them for ubiquitination and subsequent "mutually-assured destruction" in the proteasome. Proteolysis seems to be associated with the formation of nuclear "photobodies" that seem to be sites of liquid/liquid phase transition and chromatin reorganisation. However, Pfr binding releases PIFs from their gene targets prior to proteolysis. Indeed, the photosensory module can regulate photomorphogenesis autonomously without inducing proteolysis or photobody formation. As PIFs are the primary effectors of etiolation in darkness, interaction with Pfr induces photomorphogenesis by both processes.

== Historical aspects ==
(This section gives a detailed description of phytochrome research. A brief outline of crucial events is given in the "Discovery" section above)

Early work on what became known as phytochrome was a gradual process: there was no single date or event that can be credited with its discovery. A crucial initial discovery was by Garner & Allard at the Virginia facility USA Dept. of Agriculture in 1920 that flowering of crops and other plants was regulated by daylength. In the 1930s, Flint & McAlister reported that lettuce seed germination was induced by red light but suppressed by far-red light. Independently, Dieter Meischke in Germany reported similar behaviour in various species and also suggested that the far-red effect might be associated with the significance of leafy shade in seedling survival, chlorophyll-bearing leaves absorbing red but not far-red light: far-red would thus signal the presence of competitors. Flint & McAlister's work lead to a second crucial discovery by Sterling Hendricks and Harry Borthwick at the USDA laboratory at Beltsville in Maryland: if seeds were given a series of red and far-red light pulses but otherwise kept moist in total darkness, only the final red or far-red pulse determined whether they would germinate or not. This R/FR photoreversible response was quite unexpected, prompting the suggestion that a single photochromic photoreceptor might be responsible. In darkness it was inactive, but preferentially absorbed red light (thus P_{red} or "Pr") to generate a signalling state that induced germination. The absorption maximum of the signalling state was shifted to the far-red region, however (thus P_{far-red} or "Pfr"), and light absorption by Pfr converted the pigment back to the physiologically inactive Pr state. The significance of the work was greatly expanded when the group found that equivalent R/FR light pulses gave similar results regarding daylength regulation of flowering. Already in 1950, Time magazine ran a short feature on these discoveries. However, it had not been realised that the actual amounts of the photoreceptor involved were extremely small, so intense work over several years failed to reveal an appropriately R/FR photochromic pigment. Finally, however, in 1959 Warren Butler and Harold Siegelman at Beltsville developed a sophisticated spectrophotometer that was able to detect the R/FR-induced absorption changes in dark-grown turnip seedlings that contained not only relatively large amounts of phytochrome but also very small amounts of chlorophyll that otherwise masked the phytochrome signal. Butler also coined the name "phytochrome" at about this time.

Phytochrome became a pawn in the Cold War when Nikita Khrushchev visited the USA in 1959. On the first day of his guided tour, he was taken to the Beltsville laboratory where Borthwick explained the phytochrome work to him. He was also given a demonstration of phytochrome photochromicity using Butler's equipment, presumably as an attempt to prove Western technological superiority in the face of Soviet domination of space exploration.

Various problems arose as phytochrome work progressed. For example, although R/FR photoreversiblity with light pulses was shown in photoregulation of anthocyanin accumulation and seedling elongation, much more dramatic effects were seen under strong, continuous light at around 710 nm, between the Pr and Pfr absorption maxima. How then could this "high irradiance response" be a phytochrome effect? Was there, perhaps, another photoreceptor active in that region? More importantly, as it turned out, questions were raised as to whether the phytochrome from dark-grown seedlings ("bulk phytochrome") that was being studied was the same thing as the one active in light-grown (i.e. green) plants. Indeed, photometers failed to detect phytochrome-typical R/FR photochromicity in green plant tissues. The action mechanism of phytochrome was also quite unclear. Following Jacob & Monod's seminal work, it was easy to imagine that phytochrome might somehow be acting via gene regulation, but how that would happen was a complete mystery. It took many years to answer these questions.

In the 1970s, on the one hand, protein biochemistry was improving rapidly, allowing phytochrome to be extracted from dark-grown seedlings, purified and concentrated so that its properties could be studied exactly. The chromophore (the co-factor pigment actually responsible for light absorption) was shown to be a "straight-chain pyrrole" as had already been suggested in 1950 and even the amino acid sequence of the fragment to which it is attached was determined. It proved difficult to extract undamaged phytochrome from plants, but finally in 1983 the laboratories of Peter Quail (then at the University of Wisconsin) and Clark Lagarias (at UC Davis) successfully purified intact phytochrome from dark-grown oat seedlings. On the other hand, interest in ecological aspects of biology was growing. Thus Harry Smith's group at Nottingham University in England took up the idea of phytochrome acting as a photochromic detector of low R/FR ratios resulting from chlorophyll absorption by the leaves of neighbouring competitors, showing that stem extension in species adapted to open conditions responded strongly, whereas those adapted to life in the shade were indifferent.

Maarten Koorneef and colleagues in 1980, then at the University of Wageningen in the Netherlands, were amongst the first to understand the value of mutational genetics in biology. Working with Arabidopsis, a plant with tiny seedlings and a very small genome, he created a large population of potential mutants and simply looked for individual seedlings that kept elongating in light as though they were in darkness. These hy mutants were "blind". He identified four different HY genes, each of which was later found to encode an important component of the phytochrome system (including phyB itself, a transcription factor important in light-regulated gene expression, and two enzymes necessary for chromophore biosynthesis), as well as one that turned out to encode a blue light photoreceptor, cryptochrome. Establishing that information involved many years of painstaking research worldwide, although at the time Koorneef's paper generated very little interest. Subsequently, Arabidopsis has become the reference species and molecular genetics the central tool for basic studies of plant biology.

The first phytochrome gene was cloned and sequenced in 1984 by Howard Hershey in the Quail lab (Uniprot P06593) This was a great technical achievement by any standards, and at that time it was easily the longest plant gene sequence known. It was precocious, however: no sequences with significant similarity were known at that time, so scarcely any conclusions could be drawn from it. By 1987, however, work with monoclonal antibodies had shown clearly that more than one type of phytochrome existed in the plant cell, namely type I ("bulk") predominant in dark-grown seedlings, and type II predominant in green plants. Once again, it was molecular genetics in the Quail lab that provided the accurate picture as Bob Sharrock cloned and sequenced the five phytochrome genes (PHYA - E) in Arabidopsis: phyA is type I phytochrome, the rest are type II, within which phyB predominates.

By that time it had become possible to create transgenic plants, so several groups introduced modified phytochrome genes from one plant into another. The various transgenics that then overproduced one or other of the phytochromes were much shorter and more strongly pigmented than the wild-type plants, reflecting enhanced responses to the high levels of Pfr.

Up to 1990 it had been generally assumed that phytochromes were found exclusively in plants, despite the fact that Guy Valadon at the University of London had clearly demonstrated the existence of a phytochrome in the fungus Verticillium in 1982. Thus it was a surprise when in 1992 Hansjörg Schneider-Poetsch at Cologne University noticed weak similarities between plant phytochromes and the recently discovered bacterial sensory histidine protein kinase family. The idea of plant phytochromes functioning as histidine kinases was hardly tenable, however, because the necessary histidine residue is not conserved. In 1996 David Kehoe and Arthur Grossman at the Carnegie lab in Stanford identified a gene, RcaE, in the cyanobacterium Fremyella diplosiphon that was involved in light acclimation (Uniprot Q47897). The protein had sequence similarities to both plant phytochromes and sensory kinases but, under investigation in the lab, it failed to bind bilin cofactors and thereby show photochromicity. Thus it remained unclear whether it was a photoreceptor at all. In the previous year, however, the genome sequence of the cyanobacterium Synechocystis 6803 had been published and a gene identified with clear sequence similarities to a moss phytochrome that had been cloned earlier by none other than Schneider-Poetsch. Jon Hughes and Tilman Lamparter in Berlin and Clark Lagarias at UC Davis subsequently showed that the Synechocystis gene, slr0473, indeed encoded a bona fide phytochrome that they named Cph1 (cyanobacterial phytochrome 1) (Uniprot Q55168). Presumably, plant phytochromes are derived from an ancestral cyanobacterial phytochrome, perhaps by gene migration from an endosymbiotic proto-chloroplast to the nucleus. Subsequently, Seth Davis and Rick Vierstra at the University of Wisconsin discovered a more primitive "bacteriophytochrome" in the genome of the non-photosynthetic bacterium Deinococcus radiodurans (Uniprot Q9RZA4). They proposed that the chromophore attachment site was a histidine residue in the GAF domain, but Lamparter subsequently showed that it was instead a cysteine close to the N-terminus. Although DrBphP was assumed to be a light-sensitive histidine kinase, no such enzyme activity was reported. Indeed it was recently shown that it has phosphatase rather than kinase activity. The RcaE paradox has also been explained: later sequence comparisons showed clearly that it is a member of the phytochrome-related cyanobacteriochrome receptor (CBCR) group, but that the start codon is a GTG further upstream than the ATG that had been assumed (Uniprot M1V809, GenBank: BAM83580).

The discovery of prokaryotic phytochromes revolutionised the field. Not only did they help to understand phytochrome molecular structure, evolution and function, they were easy to produce using established recombinant genetic techniques in E. coli. Both the Lagarias and Hughes groups were able to engineer biosynthesis of the bilin chromophore in E. coli too, so that Cph1 holoprotein could be produced en masse, then purified and concentrated for biophysical studies. Thus in 2005, Katrina Forest at the University of Wisconsin collaborated with the Vierstra lab to crystallise the nPAS-GAF bidomain of Deinococcus BphP as Pr and solve its 3D structure (PDB 1ztu) by X-ray crystallography, showing, in particular, that the protein chain forms a knot - a highly unusual structure for a protein - around the nPAS domain. The chromophore ring geometry and linkage to the expected cysteine residue near the N-terminus were also revealed. The nPAS-GAF fragment is unable to photoconvert, however, so it was significant that, in 2008, two groups around Lars-Oliver Essen and Jon Hughes in Germany and Xiaojing Yang and Keith Moffat in Chicago published the 3D crystal structures of the complete, photochemically competent nPAS-GAF-PHY photosensory module. One structure was of Cph1 from Synechocystis as Pr (PDB 2vea), the other of PaBphP from Pseudomonas aeruginosa (Uniprot Q9HWR3) as Pfr (PDB 3c2w). They showed that the PHY domain is a GAF relative, held at a distance from the GAF domain itself by a long helix, but that also an unusual tongue-like hairpin extension of the PHY domain stretches back to make contact with the surface of the GAF domain near the chromopore. Later, the Essen lab proposed that Pr→Pfr photoconversion is associated with refolding and shortening of the tongue that would shift the position of the PHY domain, thereby possibly affecting the activity of the histidine kinase module dimer. Although supporting evidence was presented soon after by Heikki Takala and colleagues at the Universities of Jyväskylä and Gothenburg in Scandinavia, later cryo-EM structures of complete bacteriophytochromes as Pr and Pfr indicate that the shifts are much more subtle.

Work on plant phytochromes had continued in the meantime, in particular regarding their mode of action. In the early 1990s, the Chua lab at the Rockefeller University in New York City published results implying that plant phytochromes signal via G-protein, calcium/calmodulin and cyclic nucleotide systems perhaps similar to those known in animals. Although the findings were considered a great breakthrough at the time, other workers have not been able to repeat the results. However, the notion of cyclic nucleotides being involved in phytochrome signalling correlates with structural similarity of the phytochrome family to "tandem-GAF" proteins. These include two GAF-like domains separated by a long helix, very similar to the GAF-PHY arrangement seen in phytochromes: a general characteristic of tandem-GAF proteins is their involvement in cyclic nucleotide metabolism, either as cyclases or phosphodiesterases. Although it now seems unlikely that phytochrome action involves cyclic nucleotides, the tandem-GAF configuration might have evolutionary significance.

An important question was the location of plant phytochromes in the cell, as that would provide clues as to their mode of action. In the 1980s, Lee Pratt's lab at the University of Georgia had used antibodies directed principally against phyA to label it within the cell, finding that whereas Pr was distributed throughout the cytoplasm, photoconversion to Pfr lead to rapid sequestration of the protein to small areas, followed by its disappearance. What these sequestered areas represent has not been established. The picture changed dramatically in 1999, however, when workers in Japan and Germany using transgenic phytochromes tagged with fluorescent moieties showed that both phyA and phyB as Pfr are imported into the nucleus where they form "speckles", currently thought to be associated with signalling and/or proteolysis. Nuclear localisation of Pfr fitted well with the reasonable idea that phytochrome acts by regulating gene expression. Indeed, at about the same time, Weimin Ni in the Quail lab in Berkeley identified the PIF family of phytochrome-interacting transcription factors that are thought to be the primary route of phytochrome signalling (see). As PIF3 was initially identified through its binding to a C-terminal phyB fragment comprising the PAS repeat and histidine kinase-like modules, it was a great surprise to find that the primary interaction is instead with the Pfr state of photosensory module. Indeed, Tomonao Matsushita in the Nagatani lab in Kyoto showed that the phyB photosensory module alone, when dimerised in the nucleus, functions at least as effectively as the complete phyB molecule. Despite some initial confusion, it was established that the PIFs, in particular PIF3, act as regulators of genes responsible for the etiolated developmental form (skotomorphogenesis) of seedlings grown in darkness, partly through production of phytohormones such as auxin that enhance stem extension. This was made clear by the creation of pifq, a multiple PIF gene knockout mutant: pifq seedlings grown in total darkness developed similarly to wild-type seedlings grown in the light. Generally speaking, PIFs promote skotomorphogenesis and repress photomorphogenesis.

Solving the 3D crystal structures of the prokaryotic phytochrome photosensory module (see above) encouraged similar studies of plant phytochromes. The first success was in 2014 for the photosensory module of Arabidopsis phyB Pr by Sethe Burgie in the Vierstra lab (PDB 4our). Equivalent Pr structures of other plant phytochromes at higher resolution were published subsequently. Although the sequence identity relative to the photosensor of Cph1 is only about 30%, the 3D structures are remarkably similar. As in the case of prokaryotic phytochromes, it has not been possible to crystallise a complete plant phytochrome, but the emergence of cryo-electron microscopy (cryo-EM) allowed near-complete 3D structures of phyA (PDB 8f5z and others) and phyB (PDB 7rzw) in the Pr state to be solved by single-molecule imaging.

How light and thus Pfr formation regulates photomorphogenesis is a centrally important question in plant biology. Weimin Ni in the Quail lab established that phyB Pfr binds PIF3 along with Mut9-like kinases in the nucleus; the PIF is thereby rapidly phosphorylated, marking it for ubiquitination and destruction in the proteasome. The structural basis of this Pfr-dependent binding is still unclear, but recent cryo-EM studies of phyB Pfr in complex with a fragment of PIF6 (PDB 8yb4 and 9jlb) show a domain architecture radically different from that of Pr. How the remodelling is brought about is unknown. MLKs are probably not the only kinases involved in the plant phytochrome system, indeed there are suggestions that plant phytochromes themselves possess kinase activity. Furthermore, transcription factors other than PIFs are involved: much less well understood is the converse function of HY5, a Pfr-dependent transcriptional co-activator of photomorphogenesis.

== Sources ==
- Sage LC (1992). A pigment of the imagination: a history of phytochrome research. Academic Press. ISBN 0-12-614445-1.
