= Planetary flyby =

Sending a space probe past a planet or dwarf planet

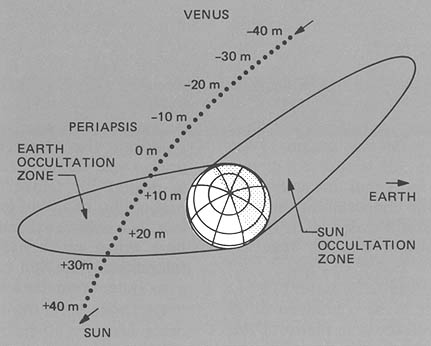
Plot of Mariner 10 flyby of planet Venus in February 1974

A planetary flyby is the act of sending a space probe past a planet or a dwarf planet close enough to record scientific data. This is a subset of the overall concept of a flyby in spaceflight.

The first flyby of another planet with a functioning spacecraft took place on December 14, 1962, when Mariner 2 zoomed by the planet Venus.

Planetary flybys are commonly used as gravity assist maneuvers to "slingshot" a space probe toward its primary target without expending fuel, but in some cases (such as with New Horizons), flybys are the primary objectives of a mission in of themselves. Flybys modify the direction of the probe and adds to its heliocentric velocity.

A relatively recent example of a flyby spacecraft is New Horizons, which performed flyby maneuvers of Jupiter, Pluto and its moons in the 21st century. The flyby of Jupiter, used as a gravity assist, allowed the craft to reach Pluto at high velocity without the complications of slowing down, after which it proceeded further into the Kuiper Belt on an escape trajectory out of the Solar System.

== List of planetary flybys ==
Flyby date	Launch date	Operator	Spacecraft	Details	Mission result
19 May 1961	12 February 1961	(Soviet Union)	Venera 1	First Venus flyby (contact lost before flyby)	Failure
14 December 1962	27 August 1962	(United States)	Mariner 2	First successful non-lunar planetary encounter and first successful Venus flyby	Success
19 June 1963	1 November 1962	(Soviet Union)	Mars 1	First Mars flyby (contact lost)	Failure
19 July 1964	2 April 1964	(Soviet Union)	Zond 1	Venus flyby (contact lost)	Failure
15 July 1965	28 November 1964	(United States)	Mariner 4	First successful Mars flyby	Success
6 August 1965	30 November 1964	(Soviet Union)	Zond 2	Mars flyby (contact lost)	Failure
27 February 1966	12 November 1965	(Soviet Union)	Venera 2	Venus flyby (contact lost)	Failure
19 October 1967	14 June 1967	(United States)	Mariner 5	Venus flyby	Success
31 July 1969	25 February 1969	(United States)	Mariner 6	Mars flyby	Success
5 August 1969	27 March 1969	(United States)	Mariner 7	Mars flyby	Success
3 December 1973	3 March 1972	(United States)	Pioneer 10	First Jupiter flyby	Success
5 February 1974	4 November 1973	(United States)	Mariner 10	Venus flyby; first interplanetary gravity assist	Success
10 February 1974	21 July 1973	(Soviet Union)	Mars 4	Mars flyby (inadvertent; attempted Mars orbiter)	Failure
9 March 1974	9 August 1973	(Soviet Union)	Mars 7	Mars flyby (inadvertent; attempted Mars lander)	Failure
12 March 1974	5 August 1973	(Soviet Union)	Mars 6	Mars flyby (flyby succeeded but lander failed)	Failure
29 March 1974	4 November 1973	(United States)	Mariner 10	First Mercury flyby	Success
21 September 1974	4 November 1973	(United States)	Mariner 10	Mercury flyby	Success
3 December 1974	5 April 1973	(United States)	Pioneer 11	Jupiter flyby	Success
16 March 1975	4 November 1973	(United States)	Mariner 10	Mercury flyby	Success
19 December 1978	14 September 1978	(Soviet Union)	Venera 12	Venus flyby and lander	Success
25 December 1978	9 September 1978	(Soviet Union)	Venera 11	Venus flyby and lander	Success
5 March 1979	5 September 1977	(United States)	Voyager 1	Jupiter flyby	Success
9 July 1979	20 August 1977	(United States)	Voyager 2	Jupiter flyby	Success
1 September 1979	5 April 1973	(United States)	Pioneer 11	First Saturn flyby	Success
12 November 1980	5 September 1977	(United States)	Voyager 1	Saturn flyby	Success
25 August 1981	20 August 1977	(United States)	Voyager 2	Saturn flyby	Success
1 March 1982	30 October 1981	(Soviet Union)	Venera 13	Venus flyby and lander	Success
5 March 1982	4 November 1981	(Soviet Union)	Venera 14	Venus flyby and lander	Success
11 June 1985	15 December 1984	(Soviet Union)	Vega 1	Venus flyby, lander, and first balloon	Success
15 June 1985	21 December 1984	(Soviet Union)	Vega 2	Venus flyby, lander, and balloon	Success
24 January 1986	20 August 1977	(United States)	Voyager 2	First and only Uranus flyby	Success
25 August 1989	20 August 1977	(United States)	Voyager 2	First and only Neptune flyby	Success
10 February 1990	13 October 1989	(United States)	Galileo	Venus flyby, first of three gravity assists to Jupiter	Success
2 July 1990	2 July 1985	European Space Agency	Giotto	First Earth flyby, gravity assist for extended mission to 26P/Grigg–Skjellerup	Success
8 October 1990	13 October 1989	(United States)	Galileo	Earth flyby, second of three gravity assists to Jupiter	Success
8 January 1992	7 January 1985	(Japan)	Sakigake	Earth flyby	Success
8 February 1992	6 October 1990	(United States)	Ulysses	Jupiter flyby, inclination change gravity assist for solar mission	Success
8 December 1992	13 October 1989	(United States)	Galileo	Earth flyby, last of three gravity assists to Jupiter	Success
24 August 1993	25 September 1992	(United States)	Mars Observer	Mars flyby (inadvertent; attempted Mars orbiter)	Failure
23 January 1998	17 February 1996	(United States)	NEAR Shoemaker	Earth flyby, gravity assist to 433 Eros	Success
26 April 1998	15 October 1997	(United States)	Cassini–Huygens	Venus flyby, first of four gravity assists to Saturn	Success
24 June 1999	15 October 1997	(United States)	Cassini–Huygens	Venus flyby, second of four gravity assists to Saturn	Success
18 August 1999	15 October 1997	(United States)	Cassini–Huygens	Earth flyby, third of four gravity assists to Saturn	Success
30 December 2000	15 October 1997	(United States)	Cassini–Huygens	Jupiter flyby, last of four gravity assists to Saturn	Success
15 January 2001	27 February 1999	(United States)	Stardust	Earth flyby, gravity assist to 81P/Wild	Success
21 April 2002	4 July 1998	(Japan)	Nozomi	Earth flyby, first of two gravity assists to Mars	Success
19 June 2003	4 July 1998	(Japan)	Nozomi	Earth flyby, last of two gravity assists to Mars	Success
14 December 2003	4 July 1998	(Japan)	Nozomi	Mars flyby (inadvertent; planned Mars orbiter)	Failure
19 May 2004	9 May 2003	(Japan)	Hayabusa	Earth flyby, gravity assist to 25143 Itokawa	Success
4 March 2005	2 March 2004	European Space Agency	Rosetta	Earth flyby, first of four gravity assists to 67P/Churyumov–Gerasimenko	Success
2 August 2005	3 August 2004	(United States)	MESSENGER	Earth flyby, first gravity assist to Mercury	Success
15 January 2006	27 February 1999	(United States)	Stardust	Earth flyby and sample return capsule reentry	Success
24 October 2006	3 August 2004	(United States)	MESSENGER	Venus flyby, second gravity assist to Mercury	Success
25 February 2007	2 March 2004	European Space Agency	Rosetta	Mars flyby, second of four gravity assists to 67P/Churyumov–Gerasimenko	Success
28 February 2007	19 January 2006	(United States)	New Horizons	Jupiter flyby, gravity assist to Pluto/Charon system	Success
5 June 2007	3 August 2004	(United States)	MESSENGER	Venus flyby, third gravity assist to Mercury. Also characterized the planet's atmosphere.	Success
13 November 2007	2 March 2004	European Space Agency	Rosetta	Earth flyby, third of four gravity assists to 67P/Churyumov–Gerasimenko	Success
31 December 2007	12 January 2005	(United States)	Deep Impact (EPOXI)	Earth flyby	Success
14 January 2008	3 August 2004	(United States)	MESSENGER	Mercury flyby, fourth gravity assist before orbital insertion and primary mission	Success
6 October 2008	3 August 2004	(United States)	MESSENGER	Mercury flyby, fifth gravity assist before orbital insertion and primary mission	Success
29 December 2008	12 January 2005	(United States)	Deep Impact (EPOXI)	Earth flyby	Success
14 January 2009	27 February 1999	(United States)	Stardust	Earth flyby, gravity assist to 9P/Tempel	Success
18 February 2009	27 September 2007	(United States)	Dawn	Mars flyby, gravity assist to 4 Vesta	Success
29 June 2009	12 January 2005	(United States)	Deep Impact (EPOXI)	Earth flyby (distant)	Success
29 September 2009	3 August 2004	(United States)	MESSENGER	Mercury flyby, sixth and final gravity assist before orbital insertion and primary mission	Success
13 November 2009	2 March 2004	European Space Agency	Rosetta	Earth flyby, last of four gravity assists to 67P/Churyumov–Gerasimenko	Success
28 December 2009	12 January 2005	(United States)	Deep Impact (EPOXI)	Earth flyby (distant)	Success
27 June 2010	12 January 2005	(United States)	Deep Impact (EPOXI)	Earth flyby	Success
6 December 2010	20 May 2010	(Japan)	Akatsuki	Venus flyby (inadvertent; was intended to be orbit insertion; later successfully inserted into orbit in 2015)	Failure
8 December 2010	20 May 2010	(Japan)	IKAROS	Venus flyby, probe was a technological demonstrator that launched with Akatsuki	Success
9 October 2013	5 August 2011	(United States)	Juno	Earth flyby, gravity assist to Jupiter	Success
14 July 2015	19 January 2006	(United States)	New Horizons	First and only Pluto/Charon flyby (Note: The International Astronomical Union classifies Charon as a moon. See Charon (moon)#Classification for details.)	Success
3 December 2015	3 December 2014	(Japan)	Hayabusa2	Earth flyby, gravity assist to 162173 Ryugu	Success
22 September 2017	8 September 2016	(United States)	OSIRIS-REx	Earth flyby, gravity assist to 101955 Bennu	Success
3 October 2018	12 August 2018	(United States)	Parker Solar Probe	Venus flyby	Success
26 November 2018	5 May 2018	(United States)	Mars Cube One	Mars flyby	Success
10 April 2020	20 October 2018	European Space Agency	BepiColombo	Earth flyby	Success
23 July 2020	~10 February 2021	(China)	Tianwen 1 deployable camera	Mars flyby	Success
15 October 2020	20 October 2018	European Space Agency	BepiColombo	Venus flyby	Success
5 December 2020	3 December 2014	(Japan)	Hayabusa2	Earth flyby, gravity assist to 98943 Torifune	Success
27 December 2020	10 February 2020	European Space Agency	Solar Orbiter	Venus flyby	Success
9 August 2021	10 February 2020	European Space Agency	Solar Orbiter	Venus flyby	Success
10 August 2021	20 October 2018	European Space Agency	BepiColombo	Venus flyby	Success
1 October 2021	20 October 2018	European Space Agency	BepiColombo	Mercury flyby #1	Success
27 November 2021	10 February 2020	European Space Agency	Solar Orbiter	Earth flyby	Success
23 June 2022	20 October 2018	European Space Agency	BepiColombo	Mercury flyby #2	Success
4 September 2022	10 February 2020	European Space Agency	Solar Orbiter	Venus flyby	Success
16 October 2022	16 October 2021	(United States)	Lucy	Earth flyby	Success
19 June 2023	20 October 2018	European Space Agency	BepiColombo	Mercury flyby #3	Success
24 September 2023	8 September 2016	(United States)	OSIRIS-REx/ApEx	Earth flyby, gravity assist to 99942 Apophis	Success
19-20 August 2024	14 April 2023	European Space Agency	JUICE	First double flyby and first Lunar-Earth flyby	Success
4 September 2024	20 October 2018	European Space Agency	BepiColombo	Mercury flyby #4 - Closest planetary flyby ever done (165 km altitude)	Success
1 December 2024	20 October 2018	European Space Agency	BepiColombo	Mercury flyby #5	Success
8 January 2025	20 October 2018	European Space Agency	BepiColombo	Mercury flyby #6	Success
1 March 2025	14 October 2024	(United States)	Europa Clipper	Mars flyby	Success
12 March 2025	7 October 2024	European Space Agency	Hera	Mars flyby	Success
31 August 2025	14 April 2023	European Space Agency	JUICE	Venus flyby	Success
15 May 2026	13 October 2023	(United States)	Psyche	Mars flyby	Success
September 2026	14 April 2023	European Space Agency	JUICE	Earth flyby	Planned
December 2026	14 October 2024	(United States)	Europa Clipper	Earth flyby	Planned
January 2029	14 April 2023	European Space Agency	JUICE	Earth flyby	Planned

== Gallery ==
The Galileo flybys featured both purely gravitational assists and scientific experiments.

== See also ==
- Mariner program
- Mars program
- Pioneer program
- Vega program
- Venera
- Voyager program
- Zond program
- List of Earth flybys
- Mars flyby
- Timeline of the Space Race
- Timeline of Solar System exploration
