= Solar probe =

Solar probe can refer to:

- the NASA Solar Probe mission (now named "Parker Solar Probe")
- List of Solar System probes, which includes many solar probes
