= Mars flyby =

Spacecraft maneuver

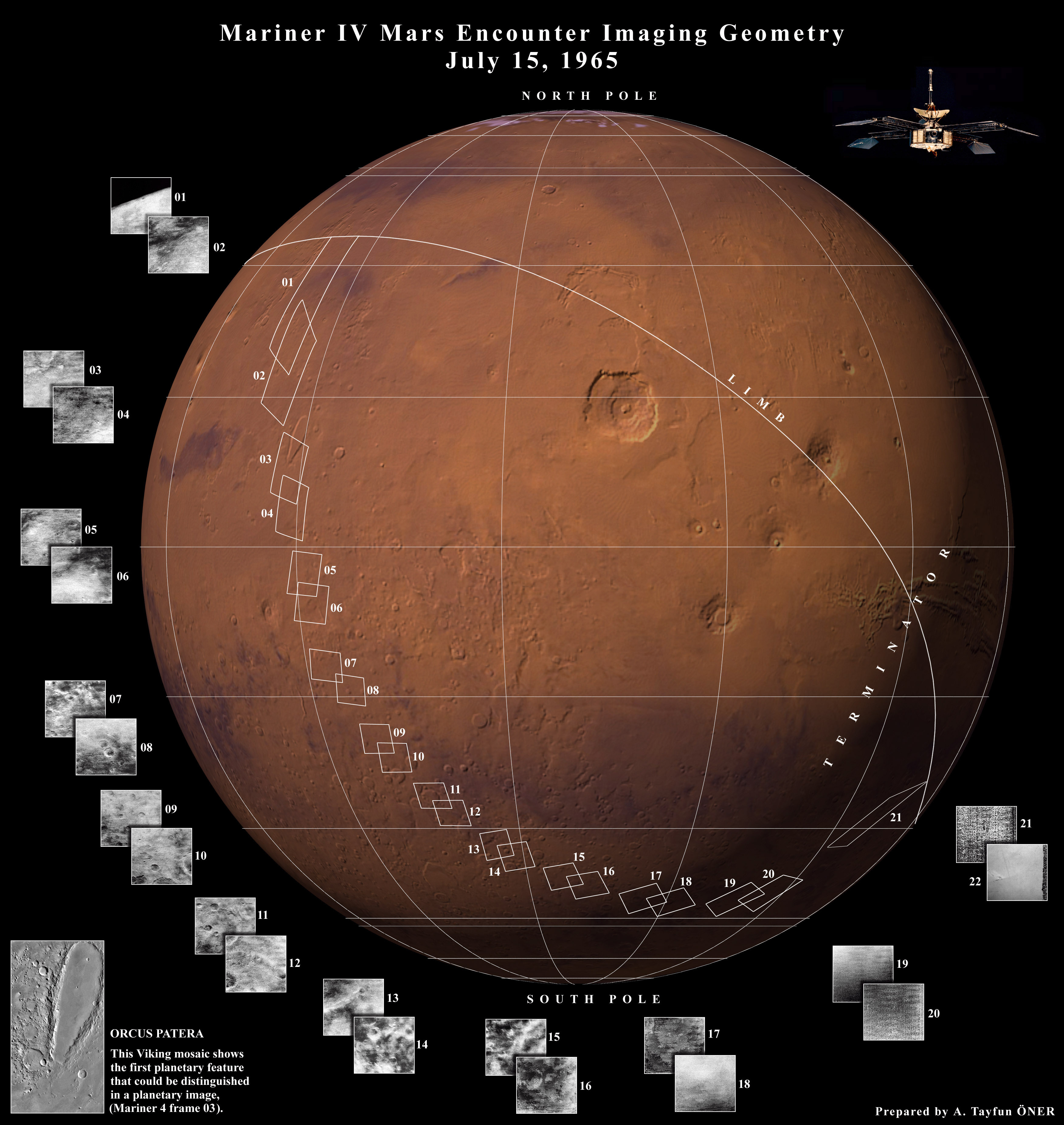
Data collected from Mariner 4's flyby on a modern map

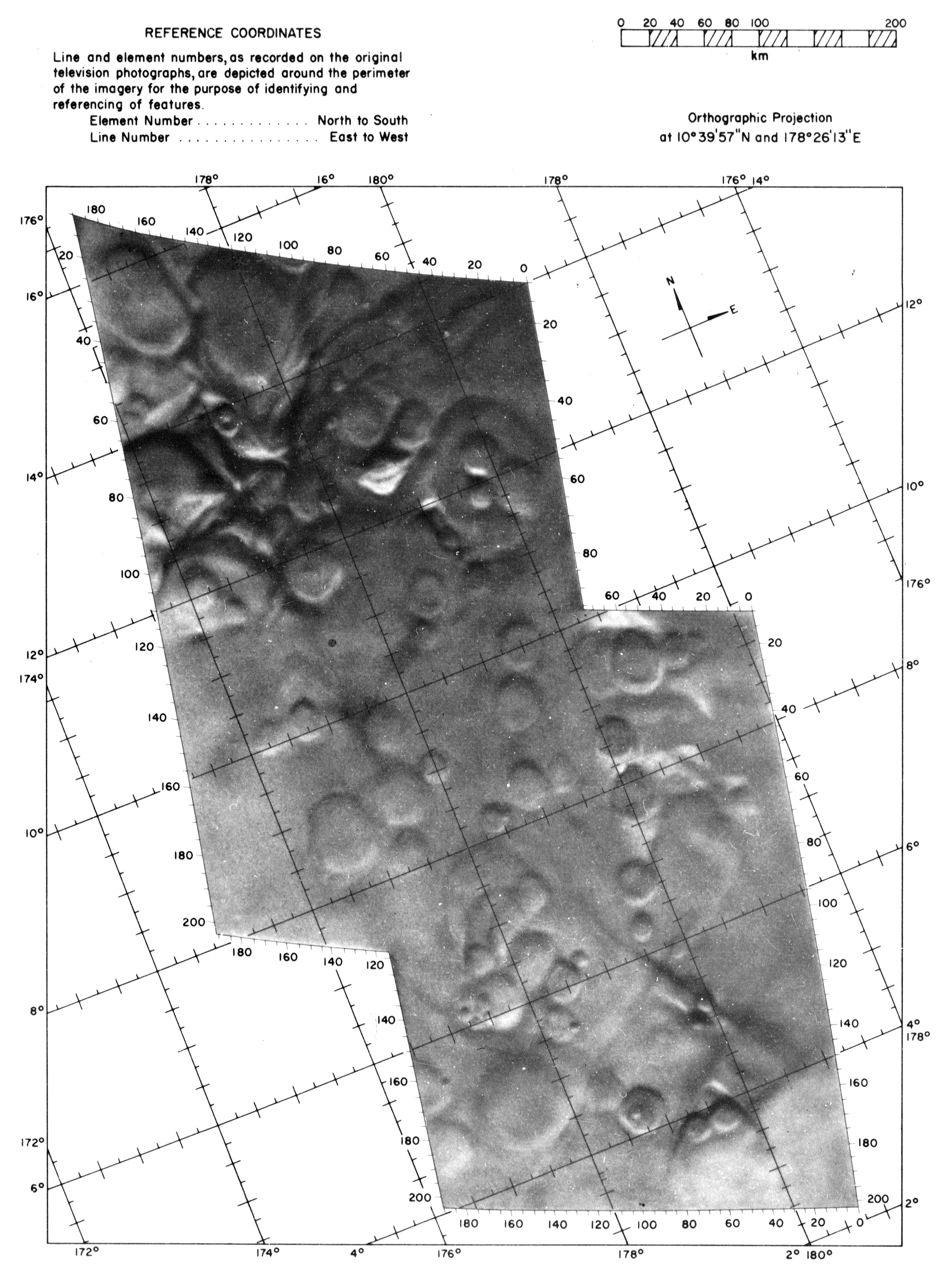
This shows two of the frames from the Mariner 4 flyby projected over a grid

A Mars flyby is a movement of spacecraft passing in the vicinity of the planet Mars, but not entering orbit or landing on it. Uncrewed space probes have used this method to collect data on Mars, as opposed to orbiting or landing. A spacecraft designed for a flyby is also known as a "flyby bus" or "flyby spacecraft".

== Concepts ==
One application of a Mars flyby is for a human mission, where after landing and staying on the surface for some time the ascent stage has a space rendezvous with another, uncrewed spacecraft, that was launched separately from Earth, flying by. This would mean the ascent stage of the lander to reach the speed necessary equal to that of the spacecraft flying by, but the resources needed for Earth return would not have to enter or leave Mars orbit.

The spacecraft they live in on the journey to Mars does the flyby, but the crew separates and goes into a lander. The Excursion module's ascent stage must rejoin the main spacecraft before it gets too far away. An advantage is that the resources needed for Earth return don't have to enter and leave Mars orbit, but the ascent stage has to perform space rendezvous in solar orbit and the time on Mars is constrained by the need to this. Mars cyclers orbit the Sun in such a way as to pass by Mars and the Earth on regular intervals, performing Mars flybys on regular intervals. The crews would live on the stations during the interplanetary voyages. The concept for Flyby Excursion Landing Module is that a lander and flyby would separate in solar orbit, the lander would accelerate to get to Mars first, then land on Mars meanwhile the other segment does a Mars flyby, then the lander takes off and rendezvous with the flyby segment transferring the crew over. (see also Mars Excursion Module (MEM))

Alternately, a flyby-only human mission is also possible, without detaching at Mars, but to slingshot around Mars and back to Earth.

== History ==
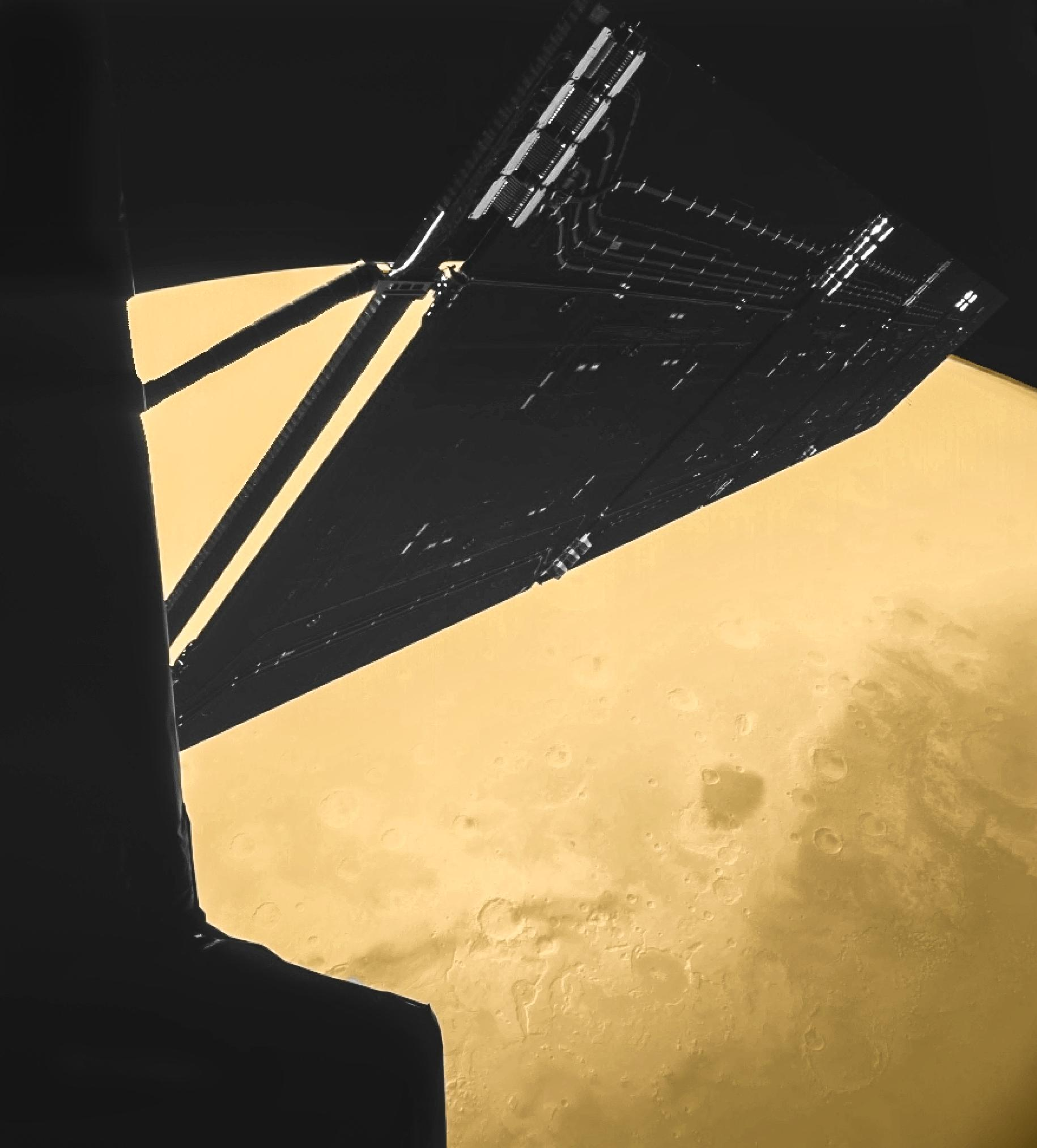
Photograph by Philae's ROLIS camera of Rosetta and Mars in February 2007

In July 1965, Mariner 4 achieved a flyby of Mars with a return of data, providing the public and scientists with dramatically closer images of Mars. During the flyby Mariner 4 took 21 pictures amounting to about 1% of the surface of Mars. Mars was not globally mapped until the Mariner 9 orbiter, which over the course of 1972 to 1973 took thousands of images up to 100m a pixel. Observations from optical ground-based Earth telescopes have to peer through the atmosphere which blurs images, typically limiting them to resolving features about 300 kilometers (190 miles) across even when Earth and Mars are closest.

In October 1999, Deep Space 1 made observations of Mars after its flyby of asteroid Braille. Although this was a very distant flyby it did succeed in taking multiple infrared spectra with its MICAS instrument of the planet.

In 2018, Mars Cube One (MarCO), two flyby CubeSats to relay communication from InSight lander during its EDL were launched towards Mars with the cruise stage. Both MarCOs reached Mars and successfully relayed data during the entry, descent, and landing phase of Insight on November 26, 2018.

== List of Mars flybys ==
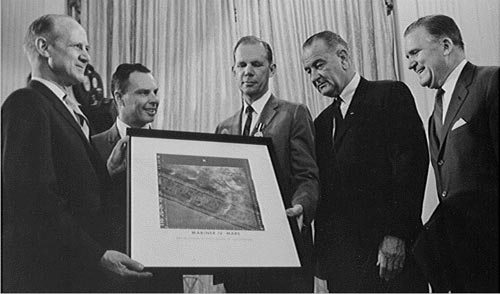
An image taken during the Mariner 4 Mars flyby is presented to President Lyndon B. Johnson.

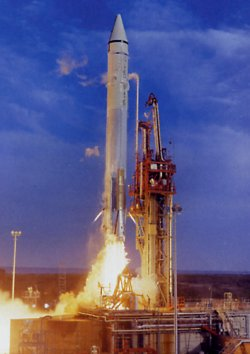
Mariner 7 lift-off

=== 20th century ===
- Mariner program spacecraft
  - Mariner 4, mapped 1% of Mars with 21 images and returned other data.
  - Mariner 6, and Mariner 7 returned data from Mars flybys, mapping about 20% of Mars more closely with a couple hundred images.
- Mars program spacecraft
  - Two Mars flyby attempts were made in 1960 under Mars 1M (Mars 1960A and Mars 1960B).
  - The third attempt at a Mars flyby was the Soviet Mars 2MV-4 No.1, also called Mars 1962A or Sputnik 22, which launched in 1962 as part of the Mars program. but it was destroyed in low Earth orbit due to rocket failure.
  - Mars 1 also launched in 1962 but communications failed before it reached Mars.
  - Mars 4 achieved a flyby in 1974 and detected a nightside ionosphere.
  - Mars 6 and 7 were Mars landers carried by instrumented flyby buses.

=== 21st century ===
- Nozomi, unintentional due to insertion failure. Flew by at about 1000 km.
- Rosetta, gravity assist to 67P/Churyumov–Gerasimenko, Closest approach was 250 km.
- Dawn, gravity assist to Vesta and Ceres. Closest approach was 549 km.
- Mars Cube One, twin flyby relay communication CubeSats for InSight lander.
- Tianwen-1 Deployable Camera, imaged Tianwen-1 in deep space.
- Europa Clipper, gravity assist to Jupiter and Europa. Closest approach was 884 km.
- Hera, gravity assist to 65803 Didymos. Closest approach was about 6000 km.
- Psyche, gravity assist to 16 Psyche. Closest approach was 4609 km.

== See also ==
- List of Earth flybys
- List of missions to Mars
- List of planetary flybys
