= List of Earth flybys =

List of cases where spacecraft incidentally performed Earth flybys

Earth imaged by MESSENGER during its 2005 flyby

List of Earth flybys is a list of cases where spacecraft incidentally performed Earth flybys, typically for a gravity assist to another body.

== Missions ==
Spacecraft	Organization	Date	Type	Closest Approach	Status	Notes	Image	Ref
Giotto (first pass)	ESA	2 July 1990	flyby	22,730 km	success	first ever Earth flyby, en route to Comet Grigg-Skjellerup		
Galileo (first pass)	NASA	8 December 1990	flyby	960 km	success	gravity assist en route to Jupiter; minimum distance 960 km		
Sakigake (first pass)	(Japan) ISAS	8 January 1992	flyby	88,790 km	success	previously visited Halley's comet		
Suisei	(Japan) ISAS	20 August 1992	flyby	failure	failure	previously visited Halley's comet; hydrazine depleted, further planned comet flybys abandoned		
Galileo (second pass)	NASA	8 December 1992	flyby	303 km	success	gravity assist en route to Jupiter		
Sakigake (second and third passes)	(Japan) ISAS	14 June 1993	flyby					
Sakigake (second and third passes)	(Japan) ISAS	28 October 1994	flyby			out of fuel; telemetry contact lost November 1995		
NEAR Shoemaker	NASA	23 January 1998	flyby	540 km	success	gravity assist en route to Eros		
Nozomi (first pass)	(Japan) ISAS	20 December 1998	flyby	1,000 km	partial success	gravity assist on planned mission to Mars; valve malfunction during flyby required extra burn, which later forced alternate trajectory plan		
Giotto (second pass)	ESA	1 July 1999	flyby	failure	n/a	already defunct		
Cassini	NASA; ESA; ASI	18 August 1999	flyby	1,171 km	success	gravity assist en route to Saturn		
Stardust (first pass)	NASA	15 January 2001	flyby	6,000 km	success	gravity assist en route to comet 81P/Wild		
Nozomi (second pass)	(Japan) ISAS	December 2002	flyby	11,000 km	success	gravity assist en route to Mars		
Nozomi (third pass)	(Japan) ISAS	19 June 2003	flyby	1,000 km	success	gravity assist en route to Mars		
Hayabusa	(Japan) ISAS	19 May 2004	flyby	20,000 km	success	en route to Itokawa		
Rosetta (first pass)	ESA	4 March 2005	flyby	1,950 km	success	gravity assist en route to asteroid and comet encounters		
MESSENGER	NASA	2 August 2005	flyby	2,348 km	success	en route to Venus and Mercury		
Stardust (second pass)	NASA	15 January 2006	flyby		success	drop-off of sample return capsule		
Rosetta (second pass)	ESA	13 November 2007	flyby	5,300 km	success	gravity assist en route to asteroid and comet encounters		
Deep Impact (redesignated EPOXI) (first pass)	NASA	31 December 2007	flyby	15,567 km	success	previously visited Comet 9P/Tempel; gravity assist en route to encounter with Comet 103P/Hartley		
Deep Impact (redesignated EPOXI) (second pass)	NASA	December 2008	flyby	43,450 km	success	gravity assist		
Stardust (third pass)	NASA	14 January 2009	flyby	9,200 km	success	mission extension to Comet 9P/Tempel; minimum distance 9200 km		
Rosetta (third pass)	ESA	13 November 2009	flyby	2,500 km	success	gravity assist en route to asteroid and comet encounters		
Deep Impact (redesignated EPOXI) (third pass)	NASA	June 2009	distant flyby	1,330,000 km	success			
Deep Impact (redesignated EPOXI) (fourth pass)	NASA	December 2009	distant flyby	1,320,000 km	success			
Deep Impact (redesignated EPOXI) (fifth pass)	NASA	June 2010	flyby	36,900 km	success			
Juno	NASA	9 October 2013	flyby	559 km	success	gravity assist en route to Jupiter		2011-040A
Hayabusa2 (first pass)	JAXA	3 December 2015	flyby	1,350 km	success	gravity assist en route to Asteroid 162173 Ryugu		2014-076A
PROCYON	(Japan) University of Tokyo; JAXA	3 December 2015	flyby		success	was en route to Asteroid 2000 DP107 but mission abandoned		2014-076D
Shin'en 2	(Japan) Kyutech	4 December 2015	flyby		success			2014-076B
OSIRIS-REx	NASA	22 September 2017	flyby	17,237 km	success	gravity assist en route to Asteroid 101955 Bennu		2016-055A
BepiColombo	ESA; JAXA	10 April 2020	flyby	12,700 km	success	gravity assist en route to Venus and Mercury		BEPICLMBO
Hayabusa2 (second pass)	JAXA	5 December 2020	flyby	290 km	success	gravity assist en route to Asteroid 98943 Torifune		2014-076A
Chang'e 5 Orbiter	(China) CNSA	17 December 2020	flyby	5,000 km	success	release the sample return capsule；gravity assist en route to Sun-Earth L_{1}		2020-087A
Solar Orbiter	ESA	26 November 2021	flyby	455 km	success	gravity assist en route to inclined heliocentric orbit		2020-010A
Lucy	NASA	16 October 2022	flyby	300 km	success	gravity assist en route to Jupiter Trojans		2021-093A
OSIRIS-APEX	NASA	24 September 2023	flyby	779 km	success	gravity assist en route to Asteroid 99942 Apophis (OSIRIS-REx mission extension)		2016-055A
Chang'e 6 Orbiter	(China) CNSA	25 June 2024	flyby	5,000 km	success	release the sample return capsule；gravity assist en route to Sun-Earth L_{2}		2024-083A
Juice	(Europe) ESA	20 August 2024	flyby	6,807 km	success	gravity assist en route to Jupiter.		2023-053A
Lucy	NASA	13 December 2024	flyby	350 km	success	gravity assist en route to Jupiter Trojans		2021-093A
OSIRIS-APEX	NASA	23 September 2025	flyby	3,442 km	success	gravity assist en route to Asteroid 99942 Apophis (OSIRIS-REx mission extension)		2016-055A
Juice	(Europe) ESA	28 September 2026	flyby	8,641 km	success	gravity assist en route to Jupiter.		2023-053A
ESCAPADE Blue	NASA	7 November 2026	flyby	1,609 km	success	gravity assist en route to Mars		2025-260A
ESCAPADE Gold	NASA	9 November 2026	flyby	1,046 km	success	gravity assist en route to Mars		2025-260B
Europa Clipper	NASA	3 December 2026	flyby	3,200 km	en route	gravity assist en route to Jupiter		EUROPA-CL
OSIRIS-APEX	NASA	17 March 2027	flyby	4,146 km	en route	gravity assist en route to Asteroid 99942 Apophis (OSIRIS-REx mission extension)		2016-055A
Tianwen-2 Orbiter	(China) CNSA	29 November 2027	flyby	17,000 km	en route	gravity assist en route to P/2013 P5		2025-114A
Juice	(Europe) ESA	18 January 2029	flyby	4,600 km	en route	gravity assist en route to Jupiter.		2023-053A
OSIRIS-APEX	NASA	13 April 2029	flyby	1,153 km	en route	gravity assist en route to Asteroid 99942 Apophis (OSIRIS-REx mission extension)		2016-055A
Lucy	NASA	26 December 2030	flyby	660 km	en route	gravity assist en route to Jupiter Trojans		2021-093A

== See also ==
- List of Solar System probes
- Gravity assist
- Planetary flyby
- Mars flyby
