= List of Solar System probes =

This is a list of space probes that have left Earth orbit (or were launched with that intention but failed), organized by their planned destination. It includes planetary probes, solar probes, and probes to asteroids and comets. Flybys (such as gravity assists) that were incidental to the main purpose of the mission are also included.

Excluded are lunar missions, which are listed separately at List of lunar probes and List of Apollo missions. Flybys of Earth are listed separately at List of Earth flybys. Planned and proposed missions are in the List of proposed Solar System probes.

== Key ==
Colour key:

– Mission or flyby completed successfully (or partially successfully)	– Failed mission
– Mission en route or in progress (including mission extensions)

- ^{†} means "tentatively identified", as classified by NASA. These are Cold War-era Soviet missions, mostly failures, about which few or no details have been officially released. The information given may be speculative.
- Date is the date of:

- closest encounter (flybys)
- impact (impactors)
- orbital insertion to end of mission, whether planned or premature (orbiters)
- landing to end of mission, whether planned or premature (landers)
- launch (missions that never got underway due to failure at or soon after launch)
In cases which do not fit any of the above, the event to which the date refers is stated. As a result of this scheme missions are not always listed in order of launch.

- Some of the terms used under Type:

- Flyby: The probe flies by an astronomical body, but does not orbit it
- Orbiter: Part of a probe that orbits an astronomical body
- Lander: Part of a probe that descend to the surface of an astronomical body
- Rover: Part of a probe that acts as a vehicle to move on the solid-surface of an astronomical body
- Penetrator: Part of a probe that impacts an astronomical body
- Atmospheric probe or balloon: Part of a probe that descend through or floats in the atmosphere of an astronomical body; not restricted to weather balloons and other atmospheric sounders, as it can also be used for surface and subsurface imaging and remote sensing.
- Sample return: Parts of the probe return to Earth with physical samples

- Under Status, in the case of flybys (such as gravity assists) that are incidental to the main mission, "success" indicates the successful completion of the flyby, not necessarily that of the main mission.

== Solar probes ==
While the Sun is not physically explorable with current technology, the following solar observation probes have been designed and launched to operate in heliocentric orbit or at one of the Earth–Sun Lagrangian points – additional solar observatories were placed in Earth orbit and are not included in this list:

=== 1960–1969 ===
Spacecraft	Organization	Date	Type	Status	Notes	Image	Ref
Pioneer 5	(United States) NASA/ DOD	March–April 1960	orbiter	success	measured magnetic field phenomena, solar flare particles, and ionization in the interplanetary region		1960-001A
Pioneer 6(A)	(United States) NASA	December 1965 – still contactable in 2000	orbiter	success	network of solar-orbiting "space weather" monitors, observing solar wind, cosmic rays, and magnetic fields		1965-105A
Pioneer 7(B)	(United States) NASA	August 1966 – still contactable in 1995	orbiter	success	network of solar-orbiting "space weather" monitors, observing solar wind, cosmic rays, and magnetic fields		1966-075A
Pioneer 8(C)	(United States) NASA	December 1967 – still contactable in 2001	orbiter	success	network of solar-orbiting "space weather" monitors, observing solar wind, cosmic rays, and magnetic fields		1967-123A
Pioneer 9(D)	(United States) NASA	November 1968 – May 1983	orbiter	success	network of solar-orbiting "space weather" monitors, observing solar wind, cosmic rays, and magnetic fields		1968-100A
Pioneer-E	(United States) NASA	27 August 1969	orbiter	failure	intended as part of the Pioneer 6–9 network; failed to reach orbit		PIONE

=== 1974–1997 ===
Spacecraft	Organization	Date	Type	Status	Notes	Image	Ref
Helios A	(West Germany) DFVLR/ (United States) NASA	November 1974 – 1982	orbiter	success	observations of solar wind, magnetic and electric fields, cosmic rays and cosmic dust between Earth and Sun		1974-097A
Helios B	(West Germany) DFVLR/ (United States) NASA	January 1976 – 1985?	orbiter	success	observations of solar wind, magnetic and electric fields, cosmic rays and cosmic dust between Earth and Sun		1976-003A
ISEE-3	(United States) NASA	1978–1982	orbiter	success	observed solar phenomena in conjunction with Earth-orbiting ISEE-1 and ISEE-2; later renamed International Cometary Explorer (ICE) and directed to Comet Giacobini-Zinner		1976-003A
Ulysses (first pass)	(Europe) ESA/ (United States) NASA	1994	orbiter	success	south polar observations		1990-090B
Ulysses (first pass)	(Europe) ESA/ (United States) NASA	1995	orbiter	success	north polar observations		1990-090B
WIND	(United States) NASA	November 1994 – still active as of October 2024	orbiter	success	solar wind measurements		1994-071A
SOHO	(Europe) ESA/ (United States) NASA	May 1996 – extended to December 2025	orbiter	success	investigation of Sun's core, corona, and solar wind; comet discoveries		1995-065A
ACE	(United States) NASA	August 1997 – projected until 2024	orbiter	success	solar wind observations		1997-045A

=== Since 2000 ===
Spacecraft	Organization	Date	Type	Status	Notes	Image	Ref
Ulysses (second pass)	(Europe) ESA/ (United States) NASA	2000	orbiter	success	south polar observations		1990-090B
Ulysses (second pass)	(Europe) ESA/ (United States) NASA	2001	orbiter	success	north polar observations		1990-090B
Genesis	(United States) NASA	2001–2004	orbiter/ sample return	success	solar wind sample return; crash landed on return to Earth, much data salvaged		2001-034A
STEREO A	(United States) NASA	December 2006 – still active as of October 2024	orbiter	success	stereoscopic imaging of coronal mass ejections and other solar phenomena		2006-047A
STEREO B	(United States) NASA	December 2006 – October 2014. August 2016 – October 2018 (communication lost between 1 October 2014 and 21 August 2016); NASA directed that periodic recovery operations of Stereo-B cease with last support on October 17, 2018.	orbiter	success	stereoscopic imaging of coronal mass ejections and other solar phenomena		2006-047B
Ulysses (third pass)	(Europe) ESA/ (United States) NASA	2007	orbiter	success	south polar observations		1990-090B
Ulysses (third pass)	(Europe) ESA/ (United States) NASA	2008	orbiter	partial success	north polar observations; some data returned despite failing power and reduced transmission capacity		1990-090B
DSCOVR	(United States) NOAA	February 2015 – still active as of October 2024	orbiter	success	solar wind and coronal mass ejection monitoring, as well as Earth climate monitoring		2015-007A
Parker Solar Probe	(United States) NASA	November 2018 – December 2025	orbiter/flyby (approach 26 times)	success	close-range solar coronal study		2018-065A
Solar Orbiter	(Europe) ESA	10 February 2020 (launch)	orbiter	en route	solar and heliospheric physics		2020-010A
Aditya-L1	(India) ISRO	2 September 2023 (launch)	orbiter	success	Solar corona observation		2023-132A
SWFO-L1	(United States) NOAA	24 September 2025 (launch)	orbiter	success	Space weather, solar wind and coronal mass ejection monitoring		2025-215B

== Mercury probes ==
Spacecraft	Organization	Date	Type	Status	Notes	Image	Ref
Mariner 10	(United States) NASA	29 March 1974	flyby	success	minimum distance 704 km		1973-085A
Mariner 10	(United States) NASA	21 September 1974	flyby	success	48,069 km		1973-085A
Mariner 10	(United States) NASA	16 March 1975	flyby	success	327 km		1973-085A
MESSENGER	(United States) NASA	14 January 2008	flyby	success	minimum distance 200 km		2004-030A
MESSENGER	(United States) NASA	6 October 2008	flyby	success	minimum distance 200 km		2004-030A
MESSENGER	(United States) NASA	29 September 2009	flyby	success	minimum distance 228 km		2004-030A
MESSENGER	(United States) NASA	18 March 2011 – 30 April 2015	orbiter	success	first spacecraft to orbit Mercury; unavoidable impact on the surface at end of mission		2004-030A
BepiColombo (Mercury Cruise System)	(Europe) ESA/ (Japan) JAXA	1 October 2021	flyby	success	minimum distance 199 km		2018-080A
BepiColombo (Mercury Cruise System)	(Europe) ESA/ (Japan) JAXA	23 June 2022	flyby	success	minimum distance 200 km		2018-080A
BepiColombo (Mercury Cruise System)	(Europe) ESA/ (Japan) JAXA	19 June 2023	flyby	success	minimum distance 236 km		2018-080A
BepiColombo (Mercury Cruise System)	(Europe) ESA/ (Japan) JAXA	4 September 2024	flyby	success	minimum distance 165 km - closest planetary flyby ever performed		2018-080A
BepiColombo (Mercury Cruise System)	(Europe) ESA/ (Japan) JAXA	1 December 2024	flyby	success	minimum distance 37,626 km		2018-080A
BepiColombo (Mercury Cruise System)	(Europe) ESA/ (Japan) JAXA	8 January 2025	flyby	success	minimum distance 295 km		2018-080A
Mercury; Planetary Orbiter	(Europe) ESA	21 November 2026 (orbital insertion); TBD 2027 (final MPO orbit)	orbiter	en route (attached to Mercury Cruise System)			2018-080A
Mio (Mercury; Magnetospheric Orbiter)	(Japan) JAXA	21 November 2026 (orbital insertion)	orbiter	en route (attached to Mercury Cruise System)			2018-080A

== Venus probes ==
Early programs encompassing multiple spacecraft include:

- Venera program — USSR Venus orbiter and lander (1961–1984)
- Pioneer Venus project — US Venus orbiter and entry probes (1978)
- Vega program — USSR mission to Venus and Comet Halley (1984)

=== 1961–1969 ===
Spacecraft	Organization	Date	Type	Status	Notes	Image	Ref
Tyazhely Sputnik	(Soviet Union) (USSR)	4 February 1961	lander	failure	failed to escape from Earth orbit		1961-002A
Venera 1	(Soviet Union) (USSR)	19 May 1961 – 20 May 1961	flyby	failure	contact lost 7 days after launch; first spacecraft to fly by another planet		1961-003A
Mariner 1	(United States) NASA	22 July 1962	flyby	failure	guidance failure shortly after launch		MARIN1
Sputnik 19	(Soviet Union) (USSR)	25 August 1962	lander	failure	failed to escape Earth orbit		1962-040A
Sputnik 20	(Soviet Union) (USSR)	1 September 1962	lander	failure	failed to escape Earth orbit		1962-043A
Sputnik 21	(Soviet Union) (USSR)	12 September 1962	flyby	failure	third stage exploded		1962-045A
Mariner 2	(United States) NASA	14 December 1962	flyby	success	first successful Venus flyby; minimum distance 34,773 km		1962-041A
Cosmos 21^{†}	(Soviet Union) (USSR)	11 November 1963	flyby	failure	failed to escape Earth orbit		1963-044A
Venera 1964A^{†}	(Soviet Union) (USSR)	19 February 1964	flyby	failure	failed to reach Earth orbit		
Venera 1964B^{†}	(Soviet Union) (USSR)	1 March 1964	flyby	failure	failed to reach Earth orbit		
Cosmos 27	(Soviet Union) (USSR)	27 March 1964	flyby	failure	failed to escape Earth orbit		1964-014A
Zond 1	(Soviet Union) (USSR)	1964	flyby and possible lander	failure	contact lost en route		1964-016D
Cosmos 96	(Soviet Union) (USSR)	23 November 1965	lander	failure	did not depart low Earth orbit due to a launch failure		1965-094A
Venera 1965A^{†}	(Soviet Union) (USSR)	26 November 1965	flyby	failure	launch vehicle failure?		
Venera 2	(Soviet Union) (USSR)	27 February 1966	flyby	failure	ceased to operate en route		1965-091A
Venera 3	(Soviet Union) (USSR)	1 March 1966	lander	failure	contact lost before arrival; first spacecraft to impact on the surface of another planet		1965-092A
Kosmos 167	(Soviet Union) (USSR)	17 June 1967	lander	failure	failed to escape Earth orbit		1967-063A
Venera 4	(Soviet Union) (USSR)	18 October 1967	atmospheric probe	success	continued to transmit to an altitude of 25 km		1967-058A
Mariner 5	(United States) NASA	19 October 1967	flyby	success	minimum distance 5,000 km		1967-060A
Venera 5	(Soviet Union) (USSR)	16 May 1969	atmospheric probe	success	transmitted atmospheric data for 53 minutes, to an altitude of about 26 km		1969-001A
Venera 6	(Soviet Union) (USSR)	17 May 1969	atmospheric probe	success	transmitted atmospheric data for 51 minutes, to an altitude of perhaps 10–12 km		1969-002A

=== 1970–1978 ===
Spacecraft	Organization	Date	Type	Status	Notes	Image	Ref
Cosmos 359	(Soviet Union) (USSR)	22 August 1970	lander	failure	failed to escape Earth orbit		1970-065A
Venera 7	(Soviet Union) (USSR)	15 December 1970	lander	success	first successful landing on another planet; signals returned from surface for 23 minutes		1970-060A
Cosmos 482	(Soviet Union) (USSR)	31 March 1972	lander	failure	failed to escape Earth orbit		1972-023A
Venera 8	(Soviet Union) (USSR)	22 July 1972	lander	success	signals returned from surface for 50 minutes		1972-021A
Mariner 10	(United States) NASA	5 February 1974	flyby	success	minimum distance 5768 km, en route to Mercury; first use of gravity assist by an interplanetary spacecraft		1973-085A
Venera 9	(Soviet Union) (USSR)	1975	orbiter	success	first spacecraft to orbit Venus; communications relay for lander; atmospheric and magnetic studies		1975-050A
Venera 9	(Soviet Union) (USSR)	22 October 1975	lander	success	first images from the surface; operated on surface for 53 minutes		1975-050D
Venera 10	(Soviet Union) (USSR)	1975	orbiter	success	communications relay for lander; atmospheric and magnetic studies		1975-054A
Venera 10	(Soviet Union) (USSR)	23 October 1975	lander	success	transmitted from surface for 65 minutes		1975-054D
Pioneer Venus Orbiter	(United States) NASA	4 December 1978 – 1992	orbiter	success	atmospheric and magnetic studies		1978-051A
Pioneer Venus Multiprobe	(United States) NASA	9 December 1978					
bus			probe transporter	success	deployed four atmospheric probes, then burnt up in Venusian atmosphere, continuing to transmit to 110 km altitude		1978-078A
large probe			atmospheric probe	success			1978-078D
north probe			atmospheric probe	success			1978-078E
day probe			atmospheric probe	success	survived impact and continued to transmit from surface for over an hour		1978-078G
night probe			atmospheric probe	success			1978-078F
Venera 12	(Soviet Union) SAS						
flight platform		21 December 1978	flyby	success	minimum distance 34,000 km; deployed lander and then acted as communications relay		1978-086A
descent craft		21 December 1978	lander	partial success	soft landing; transmissions returned for 110 minutes; failure of some instruments		1978-086C
Venera 11	(Soviet Union) SAS				identical to Venera 12		
flight platform		25 December 1978	flyby	success	minimum distance 34,000 km; deployed lander and then acted as communications relay		1978-084A
descent craft		25 December 1978	lander	partial success	soft landing; transmissions returned for 95 minutes; failure of some instruments		1978-084D

=== 1982–1999 ===
Spacecraft	Organization	Date	Type	Status	Notes	Image	Ref
Venera 13	(Soviet Union) SAS						
bus		1 March 1982	flyby	success	deployed lander and then acted as communications relay		1981-106A
descent craft		1 March 1982	lander	success	survived on surface for 127 minutes		1981-106D
Venera 14	(Soviet Union) SAS				identical to Venera 13		
bus		5 March 1982	flyby	success	deployed lander and then acted as communications relay		1981-110A
descent craft		5 March 1982	lander	success	survived on surface for 57 minutes		1981-110D
Venera 15	(Soviet Union) SAS	1983–1984	orbiter	success	radar mapping		1983-053A
Venera 16	(Soviet Union) SAS	1983–1984	orbiter	success	radar mapping; identical to Venera 15		1983-054A
Vega 1	(Soviet Union) SAS	11 June 1985	flyby	success	went on to fly by Halley's comet		1984-125A
Vega 1	(Soviet Union) SAS	11 June 1985	lander	failure	instruments deployed prematurely		1984-125E
Vega 1	(Soviet Union) SAS	11 June 1985	atmospheric balloon	success	floated at an altitude of about 54 km and transmitted for around 46 hours		1984-125F
Vega 2	(Soviet Union) SAS	15 June 1985	flyby	success	went on to fly by Halley's comet		1984-128A
Vega 2	(Soviet Union) SAS	15 June 1985	lander	success	transmitted from surface for 56 minutes		1984-128E
Vega 2	(Soviet Union) SAS	15 June 1985	atmospheric balloon	success	floated at an altitude of about 54 km and transmitted for around 46 hours		1984-128F
Galileo	(United States) NASA	10 February 1990	flyby	success	gravity assist en route to Jupiter; minimum distance 16,000 km		1989-084B
Magellan	(United States) NASA	10 August 1990 – 12 October 1994	orbiter	success	global radar mapping		1989-033B
Cassini	(United States) NASA/ (Europe) ESA/ (Italy) ASI	26 April 1998	flyby	success	gravity assist en route to Saturn		1997-061A
Cassini	(United States) NASA/ (Europe) ESA/ (Italy) ASI	24 June 1999	flyby	success	gravity assist en route to Saturn		1997-061A

=== Since 2006 ===
Spacecraft	Organization	Date	Type	Status	Notes	Image	Ref
Venus Express	(Europe) ESA	11 April 2006 – 18 January 2015	orbiter	success	atmospheric studies; planetary imaging; magnetic observations		2005-045A
MESSENGER	(United States) NASA	24 October 2006	flyby	success	gravity assist only; minimum distance 2990 km		2004-030A
MESSENGER	(United States) NASA	6 June 2007	flyby	success	minimum distance 300 km; en route to Mercury		2004-030A
Akatsuki (PLANET-C)	(Japan) JAXA	6 December 2010 (Venus flyby)	orbiter	failure	failed orbital insertion in 2010; success in 2015 science mission began May 2016, contact lost April 2024, end of mission declared 18 September 2025		2010-020D
Akatsuki (PLANET-C)	(Japan) JAXA	7 December 2015 (orbital insertion) – 29 May 2024	orbiter	success	failed orbital insertion in 2010; success in 2015 science mission began May 2016, contact lost April 2024, end of mission declared 18 September 2025		2010-020D
IKAROS	(Japan) JAXA	8 December 2010	flyby	success	solar sail technology development / interplanetary space exploration		2010-020E
DCAM2	(Japan) JAXA	8 December 2010 (released on 14 June 2010)	flyby (post mission)	success	imaged Ikaros in deep space		2010-020J
DCAM1	(Japan) JAXA	8 December 2010 (released on 19 June 2010)	flyby (post mission)	success	imaged Ikaros in deep space		2010-020K
Shin'en (UNITEC-1)	(Japan) UNISEC	December 2010?	flyby	failure	contact lost shortly after launch		2010-020F
Parker Solar Probe	(United States) NASA	10 October 2018	flyby	success	gravity assist en route to solar corona		2018-065A
Parker Solar Probe	(United States) NASA	26 December 2019	flyby	success	gravity assist en route to solar corona		2018-065A
Parker Solar Probe	(United States) NASA	11 July 2020	flyby	success	gravity assist en route to solar corona		2018-065A
BepiColombo (first pass)	(Europe) ESA/ (Japan) JAXA	15 October 2020	flyby	success	gravity assist en route to Mercury; minimum approach distance was about 10,720 km		2018-080A
Solar Orbiter	(Europe) ESA	27 December 2020	flyby	success	gravity assist en route to inclined heliocentric orbit for solar polar observations		2020-010A
Parker Solar Probe	(United States) NASA	20 February 2021	flyby	success	gravity assist en route to solar corona		2018-065A
Solar Orbiter	(Europe) ESA	9 August 2021	flyby	success	gravity assist en route to inclined heliocentric orbit for solar polar observations		2020-010A
BepiColombo (second pass)	(Europe) ESA/ (Japan) JAXA	10 August 2021	flyby	success	gravity assist en route to Mercury, during which it may study Venus' atmosphere and solar environment		2018-080A
Parker Solar Probe	(United States) NASA	16 October 2021	flyby	success	gravity assist en route to solar corona		2018-065A
Solar Orbiter	(Europe) ESA	4 September 2022	flyby	success	gravity assist en route to inclined heliocentric orbit for solar polar observations		2020-010A
Parker Solar Probe	(United States) NASA	21 August 2023	flyby	success	gravity assist en route to solar corona		2018-065A
Parker Solar Probe	(United States) NASA	6 November 2024	flyby	success	gravity assist en route to solar corona		2018-065A
Solar Orbiter	(Europe) ESA	18 February 2025	flyby	success	gravity assist en route to inclined heliocentric orbit		2020-010A
Juice	(Europe) ESA	31 August 2025	flyby	success	gravity assist en route to Jupiter		
Solar Orbiter	(Europe) ESA	December 2026	flyby	en route	gravity assist en route to inclined heliocentric orbit		2020-010A

== Earth flybys ==
See List of Earth flybys

In addition, several planetary probes have sent back observations of the Earth-Moon system shortly after launch, most notably Mariner 10, Pioneers 10 and 11 and both Voyager probes (Voyager 1 and Voyager 2).

== Lunar probes ==
See List of lunar probes

== Mars probes ==
Major early programs encompassing multiple probes include:

- Zond program — failed USSR flyby probe
- Mars probe program — USSR orbiters and landers
- Viking program — two NASA orbiters and landers (1974)
- Phobos program — failed USSR orbiters and Phobos landers

=== 1960–1969 ===
Spacecraft	Organization	Date	Type	Status	Notes	Image	Ref
Mars 1M No.1	(Soviet Union) USSR	10 October 1960	flyby	failure	failed to reach Earth orbit		MARSNK1
Mars 1M No.2	(Soviet Union) USSR	14 October 1960	flyby	failure	failed to reach Earth orbit		MARSNK2
Mars 1962A	(Soviet Union) USSR	24 October 1962	flyby	failure	exploded in or en route to Earth orbit		1962-057A
Mars 1962B	(Soviet Union) USSR	11 November 1962 (launch)	lander	failure	broke up during transfer to Mars trajectory		1962-062A
Mars 1	(Soviet Union) USSR	19 June 1963	flyby	failure	contact lost en route; flew within approximately 193,000 km of Mars		1962-061A
Mariner 3	(United States) NASA	5 November 1964	flyby	failure	protective shield failed to eject, preventing craft from attaining correct trajectory		1964-073A
Mariner 4	(United States) NASA	15 July 1965	flyby	success	first close-up images of Mars		1964-077A
Zond 2	(Soviet Union) USSR	6 August 1965	flyby	failure	contact lost en route; flew within 1,500 km of Mars		1964-078C
Mariner 6	(United States) NASA	31 July 1969	flyby	success			1969-014A
Mariner 7	(United States) NASA	5 August 1969	flyby	success			1969-030A
Mars 1969A	(Soviet Union) USSR	27 March 1969 (launch)	orbiter	failure	launch failure		MARS69A
Mars 1969B	(Soviet Union) USSR	2 April 1969 (launch)	orbiter	failure	launch failure		MARS69B

=== 1971–1976 ===
Spacecraft	Organization	Date	Type	Status	Notes	Image	Ref
Mariner 8	(United States) NASA	9 May 1971 (launch)	orbiter	failure	launch vehicle failure		MARINH
Kosmos 419	(Soviet Union) USSR	10 May 1971 (launch)	orbiter	failure	failed to escape Earth orbit		1971-042A
Mariner 9	(United States) NASA	14 November 1971 – 27 October 1972	orbiter	success	first spacecraft to orbit another planet		1971-051A
Mars 2	(Soviet Union) USSR	27 November 1971 – 22 August 1972	orbiter	success	first Soviet spacecraft to orbit another planet		1971-045A
Mars 2 Lander	(Soviet Union) USSR	27 November 1971	lander	failure	crashed; first manmade object to reach surface of Mars		1971-045D
PrOP-M	(Soviet Union) USSR	27 November 1971	rover	failure	never activated		
Mars 3	(Soviet Union) USSR	2 December 1971 – 22 August 1972	orbiter	partial success	attained a different orbit than intended due to insufficient fuel		1971-049A
Mars 3 Lander	(Soviet Union) USSR	2 December 1971	lander	partial success	first soft landing on Mars; contact lost 110 sec after soft landing, first picture from surface		1971-049F
PrOP-M	(Soviet Union) USSR	2 December 1971	rover	failure	never activated		
Mars 4	(Soviet Union) USSR	10 February 1974	orbiter	failure	orbit insertion failed, became flyby		1973-047A
Mars 5	(Soviet Union) USSR	12 February 1974 – 28 February 1974	orbiter	success			1973-049A
Mars 6	(Soviet Union) USSR	12 March 1974	flyby	success			1973-052A
Mars 6 Lander	(Soviet Union) USSR	12 March 1974	lander	failure	contact lost 148 sec after parachute deployment (returned 224 seconds of atmospheric data)		1973-052A
Mars 7	(Soviet Union) USSR	9 March 1974	flyby	success			1973-053A
Mars 7 Lander	(Soviet Union) USSR	9 March 1974	lander	failure	missed Mars		1973-053A
Viking 1 Orbiter	(United States) NASA	19 June 1976 – 17 August 1980	orbiter	success			1975-075A
Viking 1 Lander	(United States) NASA	20 July 1976 – 13 November 1982	lander	success			1975-075C
Viking 2 Orbiter	(United States) NASA	7 August 1976 – 25 July 1978	orbiter	success			1975-083A
Viking 2 Lander	(United States) NASA	3 September 1976 – 11 April 1980	lander	success			1975-083C

=== 1988–1999 ===
Spacecraft	Organization	Date	Type	Status	Notes	Image	Ref
Phobos 1	(Soviet Union) USSR	7 July 1988 (launch)	orbiter	failure	contact lost en route to Mars		1988-058A
Phobos 2	(Soviet Union) USSR	29 January 1989 – 27 March 1989	orbiter	partial success	Mars orbit acquired, but contact lost shortly before Phobos approach phase and deployment of Phobos landers		1988-059A
Mars Observer	(United States) NASA	25 September 1992 (launch)	orbiter	failure	contact lost shortly before Mars orbit insertion		1992-063A
Mars 96	(Russia) RKA	16 November 1996 (launch)	orbiter	failure	failed to escape Earth orbit		1996-064A
Mars 96	(Russia) RKA	16 November 1996 (launch)	lander	failure	failed to escape Earth orbit		MARS96B
Mars 96	(Russia) RKA	16 November 1996 (launch)	lander	failure	failed to escape Earth orbit		MARS96C
Mars 96	(Russia) RKA	16 November 1996 (launch)	penetrator	failure	failed to escape Earth orbit		MARS96D
Mars 96	(Russia) RKA	16 November 1996 (launch)	penetrator	failure	failed to escape Earth orbit		MARS96E
Mars Pathfinder	(United States) NASA	4 July 1997 – 27 September 1997	lander	success			1996-068A
Sojourner	(United States) NASA	6 July 1997 – 27 September 1997	rover	success	first Mars rover		MESURPR
Mars Global Surveyor	(United States) NASA	12 September 1997 – 2 November 2006	orbiter	success			1996-062A
Mars Climate Orbiter	(United States) NASA	23 September 1999	orbiter	failure	Mars orbit insertion failed due to navigation error. Part of Mars Surveyor '98.		1998-073A
Mars Polar Lander	(United States) NASA	3 December 1999	lander	failure	Contact lost just prior to entering Martian atmosphere. Part of Mars Surveyor '98.		1999-001A
Deep Space 2 "Amundsen"	(United States) NASA	3 December 1999	penetrator	failure	Contact lost just prior to entering Martian atmosphere. Part of Mars Surveyor '98.		DEEPSP2
Deep Space 2 "Scott"	(United States) NASA	3 December 1999	penetrator	failure	Contact lost just prior to entering Martian atmosphere. Part of Mars Surveyor '98.		DEEPSP2

=== 2001–2009 ===
Spacecraft	Organization	Date	Type	Status	Notes	Image	Ref
2001 Mars Odyssey	(United States) NASA	24 October 2001 – still active as of October 2024	orbiter	success	studying climate and geology; communications relay for Spirit and Opportunity rovers longest surviving spacecraft in orbit around a planet other than Earth		2001-013A
Nozomi	(Japan) ISAS	14 December 2003	orbiter	failure	failed to attain Mars orbit, became flyby		1998-041A
Mars Express	(Europe) ESA	25 December 2003 – still active as of October 2024	orbiter	success	surface imaging and mapping; first European probe in Martian orbit		2003-022A
Beagle 2	(United Kingdom) UK	25 December 2003	lander	failure	Deployed by the Mars Express; lost for 11 years and imaged by NASA's MRO in 2015		2003-022C
Mars Exploration Rover-A "Spirit"	(United States) NASA	4 January 2004 – 22 March 2010	rover	success	became stuck in May 2009; then operating as a static science station until contact lost in March 2010		2003-027A
Mars Exploration Rover-B "Opportunity"	(United States) NASA	25 January 2004 – 10 June 2018	rover	success	lost contact 10 June 2018 due to 2018 global dust storm. NASA concluded mission on 13 February 2019 after failed communication attempts since August 2018.		2003-032A
Mars Reconnaissance Orbiter	(United States) NASA	10 March 2006 – still active as of October 2024	orbiter	success	surface imaging and surveying		2005-029A
Rosetta	(Europe) ESA	25 February 2007	flyby	success	gravity assist en route to asteroid and comet encounters		2004-006A
Phoenix	(United States) NASA	25 May 2008 – 10 November 2008	lander	success	collection of soil samples near the northern pole to search for water and investigate Mars' geological history and biological potential		2007-034A
Dawn	(United States) NASA	17 February 2009	flyby	success	gravity assist en route to Vesta and Ceres		2007-043A

=== 2011–2018 ===
Spacecraft	Organization	Date	Type	Status	Notes	Image	Ref
Fobos-Grunt	(Russia) RKA	8 November 2011 (launch)	orbiter and Phobos sample return	failure	failed to escape Earth orbit		2011-065A
Yinghuo-1	(China) CNSA	8 November 2011 (launch)	orbiter	failure	failed to escape Earth orbit		YINGHUO-1
Mars Science Laboratory Curiosity	(United States) NASA	6 August 2012 –	rover	success	investigation of past and present habitability, climate and geology		2011-070A
Mangalyaan / Mars Orbiter Mission	(India) ISRO	24 September 2014 – 27 September 2022	orbiter	success	first Indian spacecraft to orbit another planet, studying Martian atmosphere; mineralogical mapping.		2013-060A
MAVEN	(United States) NASA	25 September 2014 – 6 December 2025	orbiter	success	studying Martian atmosphere		2013-063A
ExoMars Trace Gas Orbiter (ExoMars 2016)	(Europe) ESA/ (Russia) RKA	19 October 2016 –	orbiter	success	atmospheric gas analysis; communication relay for surface probes		2016-017A
Schiaparelli EDM lander	(Europe) ESA	19 October 2016	lander	failure	landing test, meteorological observation, crashed upon landing		2016-017A
InSight	(United States) NASA	26 November 2018 – 21 December 2022	lander	success	studied the deep interior of Mars, with a seismometer and a heat-flow probe.		2018-042A
MarCO A "WALL-E"	(United States) NASA	26 November 2018	flyby	success	relaying data from InSight during its entry, descent, and landing		2018-042B
MarCO B "EVE"	(United States) NASA	26 November 2018	flyby	success	relaying data from InSight during its entry, descent, and landing		2018-042C

=== Since 2020 ===
Spacecraft	Organization	Date	Type	Status	Notes	Image	Ref
Emirates Mars Mission	(United Arab Emirates) MBRSC	9 February 2021 –	orbiter	in orbit	conduct studies of Martian atmosphere		2020-047A
Tianwen-1 orbiter	(China) CNSA	10 February 2021 -	orbiter	in orbit	orbital studies of Martian surface morphology, soil, and atmosphere		2020-049A
Tianwen-1 Deployable Camera 1	(China) CNSA	~10 February 2021	flyby (post mission)	success	imaged Tianwen-1 in deep space		2020-049A
Tianwen-1 Deployable Camera 2	(China) CNSA	10 February 2021 (released on 31 December 2021)	orbiter	success	imaged Tianwen-1 orbiter and Northern Mars Ice Caps from Mars orbit.		2020-049A
Tianwen-1 lander	(China) CNSA	14 May 2021	lander	success	Reaches end of designed lifespan after successful soft landing.		2020-049A
Zhurong	(China) CNSA	22 May 2021 - 5 May 2022	rover	success	in-situ studies of Martian surface morphology, soil, and atmosphere		2020-049A
Tianwen-1 Remote Camera	(China) CNSA	1 June 2021	lander	success	imaged Tianwen-1 lander and Zhurong rover on Mars		2020-049A
Mars 2020 Perseverance	(United States) NASA	18 February 2021 -	rover	landed	investigate past and present habitability, climate, and geology; produce O_{2} from CO_{2}; collect samples for Mars Sample Return Mission		2020-052A
Mars Helicopter Ingenuity	(United States) NASA	3 April 2021 - 25 January 2024	autonomous UAV helicopter	success	experimental scout for the Perseverance rover. Took 1st flight successfully from takeoff to landing.		2020-052A
Europa Clipper	(United States) NASA	1 March 2025	flyby	success	gravity assist en route to Jupiter		EUROPA-CL
Hera	(European Union) ESA	12 March 2025	flyby	success	gravity assist en route to Didymos		HERA
Psyche	(United States) NASA	15 May 2026	flyby	success	gravity assist en route to Psyche		2023-157A
ESCAPADE Blue	(United States) NASA	13 November 2025 (launch)	orbiter	enroute	conduct studies of Martian magenetosphere		2025-260A
ESCAPADE Gold	(United States) NASA	13 November 2025 (launch)	orbiter	enroute	conduct studies of Martian magenetosphere		2025-260B
Martian Moons eXploration (MMX)	(Japan) JAXA	19 October 2026 (launch)	orbiter	enroute	Phobos Sample-return mission		2026-236A
Idefix	(France) (Germany) DLR / CNES		Phobos Moon rover	enroute	Phobos Moon rover		

=== Phobos probes ===
Spacecraft	Organization	Date	Type	Status	Notes	Image	Ref
Phobos 1	(Soviet Union) USSR	7 July 1988 (launch)	flyby	failure	contact lost en route to Mars		1988-058A
DAS	(Soviet Union) USSR	2 September 1988	fixed lander	failure	never deployed		
Phobos 2	(Soviet Union) USSR	27 March 1989 (contact lost)	flyby	failure	attained Mars orbit; contact lost prior to deployment of lander		1988-059A
DAS	(Soviet Union) USSR	27 March 1989	fixed lander	failure	never deployed		
"Frog"	(Soviet Union) USSR	27 March 1989	mobile lander	failure	never deployed		
Fobos-Grunt	(Russia) RKA	8 November 2011 (launch)	sample return	failure	failed to escape Earth orbit; launched with Yinghuo-1 Mars orbiter		2011-065A
MMX	(Japan) JAXA	19 October 2026 (launch); August 2027 (arrival)	sample return	enroute	return sample in 2031		2026-236A
Idefix	(France) (Germany) DLR / CNES		rover	to be deployed			

== Ceres probes ==
Spacecraft	Organization	Date	Type	Status	Notes	Image	Ref
Dawn	(United States) NASA	6 March 2015 – 1 November 2018	orbiter	success	first spacecraft to orbit two different celestial bodies; previously visited Vesta		2007-043A

== Asteroid probes ==
Target	Spacecraft	Organization	Date	Type	Status	Notes	Image	Ref
951 Gaspra	Galileo	(United States) NASA	29 October 1991	flyby	success	en route to Jupiter; minimum distance 1900 km		1989-084B
243 Ida	Galileo	(United States) NASA	28 August 1993	flyby	success	en route to Jupiter; minimum distance 2400 km; discovery of the first asteroid satellite Dactyl		1989-084B
1620 Geographos	Clementine	(United States) BMDO/ NASA	1994	flyby	failure	flyby cancelled due to equipment malfunction		1994-004A
253 Mathilde	NEAR; Shoemaker	(United States) NASA	27 June 1997	flyby	success	flew within 1200 km of 253 Mathilde en route to 433 Eros		1996-008A
433 Eros	NEAR; Shoemaker	(United States) NASA	January 1999	orbiter	failure	became flyby due to software and communications problems (later attempt at orbit insertion succeeded; see below)		1996-008A
9969 Braille	Deep Space 1	(United States) NASA	29 July 1999	flyby	partial success	no close-up images due to camera pointing error; went on to visit comet 19P/Borrelly		1998-061A
2685 Masursky	Cassini	(United States) NASA/ (Europe) ESA/ (Italy) ASI	23 January 2000	distant flyby	success	en route to Saturn		1997-061A
433 Eros	NEAR; Shoemaker	(United States) NASA	February 2000 – February 2001	orbiter, became lander	success	improvised landing by orbiter at end of mission		1996-008A
5535 Annefrank	Stardust	(United States) NASA	2 November 2002	distant flyby	success	went on to visit comet 81P/Wild		1999-003A
25143 Itokawa	Hayabusa	(Japan) ISAS	2005–07	sample return	success	2005: landed and collected dust grains. 2010: sample returned.		2003-019A
25143 Itokawa	MINERVA	(Japan) ISAS	12 November 2005	hopper	failure	missed target		2003-019A
132524 APL	New Horizons	(United States) NASA	June 2006	distant flyby	success	flew past Pluto successfully		2006-001A
2867 Šteins	Rosetta	(Europe) ESA	5 September 2008	flyby	success	en route to comet 67P/Churyumov–Gerasimenko		2004-006A
21 Lutetia	Rosetta	(Europe) ESA	11 July 2010	flyby	success	en route to comet 67P/Churyumov–Gerasimenko		2004-006A
4 Vesta	Dawn	(United States) NASA	16 July 2011 – 5 September 2012	orbiter	success	first spacecraft to orbit two different celestial bodies; now orbiting Ceres		2007-043A
4179 Toutatis	Chang'e 2	(China) CNSA	13 December 2012	flyby	success	came within 3.2 km (2.0 mi) to Toutatis		2010-050A
2000 DP107	PROCYON	(Japan) University of Tokyo / JAXA	12 May 2016	flyby	failure	launched with Hayabusa2 in 2014; mission abandoned after ion thruster failure		2014-076D
162173 Ryugu	Hayabusa2	(Japan) JAXA	27 June 2018 – 13 November 2019	sample return	success	matched orbit with Ryugu on 27 June 2018, samples captured on 21 Febaruay 2019 and on 11 July 2019, left Ryugu on 13 November 2019, returned sample capsule to Earth on 5 December 2020		2014-076A
162173 Ryugu	Minerva II-1A	(Japan) JAXA	21 September 2018	hopper	success			2014-076A
162173 Ryugu	Minerva II-1B	(Japan) JAXA	21 September 2018	hopper	success			2014-076A
162173 Ryugu	MASCOT	(Germany) DLR/ (France) CNES	3 October 2018	mobile lander	success			2014-076A
162173 Ryugu	SCI	(Japan) JAXA	5 April 2019	impactor	success			2014-076A
162173 Ryugu	DCAM3	(Japan) JAXA	5 April 2019	orbiter	success	observing SCI's impact, and the ejecta created by the impact		2014-076A
162173 Ryugu	Minerva II-2	(Japan) JAXA	2 October 2019	hopper	failure	Rover failed before deployment, it was deployed in orbit around the asteroid to perform gravitational measurements before it impacted on 8 October 2019.		2014-076A
101955 Bennu	OSIRIS-REx	(United States) NASA	3 December 2018	sample return	success	Observation phase began on 17 August 2018, matched orbit with Bennu on 3 December 2018, orbital insertion on 31 December 2018, sample captured on 20 October 2020, left Bennu on 10 May 2021, returned sample capsule to Earth on 24 September 2023.		2016-055A
2002 GT	Deep Impact	(United States) NASA	January 2020	flyby	failure	contact lost; previously visited comet 103P/Hartley		2005-001A
65803 Didymos	DART	(United States) NASA	26 September 2022	flyby/impactor	success	kinetic impactor of Dimorphos to test planetary defense		2021-110A
65803 Didymos	LICIACube	(Italy) ASI	26 September 2022	flyby	success	observed DART's impact		2021-110A
2020 GE (tentative)	Near-Earth Asteroid Scout	(United States) NASA	16 November 2022 (launch)	flyby	failure	Small spacecraft asteroid flyby technology demonstration. Communication failure		NEA-SCOUT
152830 Dinkinesh	Lucy	(United States) NASA	1 November 2023	flyby	success	Main-belt asteroid flyby en route to Jupiter Trojans; minimum distance 425 km; discovered a natural satellite of the asteroid		2021-093A
52246 Donaldjohanson	Lucy	(United States) NASA	20 April 2025	flyby	success	Main-belt asteroid flyby en route to Jupiter Trojans		2021-093A
2022 OB5	Brokkr-2	(United States) AstroForge	27 February 2025 (launch); December 2025 (flyby)	flyby	failure	Near-Earth asteroid flyby and determine if the asteroid is metallic as a test for space mining. Mission failed due to communication and tumbling issues.		2025-038A
469219 Kamoʻoalewa	Tianwen-2 (ZhengHe)	(China) CNSA	4 July 2026	sample return	in orbit	performed rendezevous burn on 7 June 2026, matched orbit with Kamo'oelawa on 4 July 2026. Will collect and return samples from an Apollo NEA		2025-114A
98943 Torifune	Hayabusa2	(Japan) JAXA	5 July 2026	flyby	success			2014-076A
3548 Eurybates	Lucy	(United States) NASA	August 2027	flyby	en route	first flyby of a Jupiter trojan		2021-093A
15094 Polymele	Lucy	(United States) NASA	September 2027	flyby	en route			2021-093A
65803 Didymos	Hera	(Europe) ESA	2027	orbiter	in orbit	studying effects of DART's impact on the asteroid		HERA
65803 Didymos	Milani	(Europe) ESA	2027	orbiter	en route	to be deployed from Hera		HERA
65803 Didymos	Juventas	(Europe) ESA	2027	orbiter	en route	to be deployed from Hera		HERA
(65803) Dimorphos	Milani	(Europe) ESA		Orbiter/lander	en route			
11351 Leucus	Lucy	(United States) NASA	April 2028	flyby	en route			2021-093A
21900 Orus	Lucy	(United States) NASA	November 2028	flyby	en route			2021-093A
99942 Apophis	OSIRIS-APEX (formerly OSIRIS-REx)	(United States) NASA	21 April 2029	orbiter	en route	study of a C-type asteroid in 2029		2016-055A
16 Psyche	Psyche	(United States) NASA	13 October 2023 (launch); August 2029 (arrival)	orbiter	en route	selected for mission #14 of NASA's Discovery Program to explore a metallic asteroid.		2023-157A
1998 KY26	Hayabusa2	(Japan) JAXA	2030	flyby	en route	flyby of a fast rotator asteroid		2014-076A
Patroclus and Menoetius	Lucy	(United States) NASA	March 2033	flyby	en route	first flyby of a Trojan Camp Jupiter Trojan		2021-093A

== Jupiter probes ==
Spacecraft	Organization	Date	Type	Status	Notes	Image	Ref
Pioneer 10	(United States) NASA	3 December 1973	flyby	success	first probe to cross the asteroid belt; first Jupiter probe; first man-made object on an interstellar trajectory; now in the outer regions of the Solar System but no longer contactable		1972-012A
Pioneer 11	(United States) NASA	4 December 1974	flyby	success	went on to visit Saturn		1973-019A
Voyager 1	(United States) NASA	5 March 1979	flyby	success	went on to visit Saturn		1977-084A
Voyager 2	(United States) NASA	9 July 1979	flyby	success	went on to visit Saturn, Uranus and Neptune		1977-076A
Ulysses (first pass)	(Europe) ESA/ (United States) NASA	February 1992	flyby	success	gravity assist en route to inclined heliocentric orbit for solar polar observations		1990-090B
Galileo Orbiter	(United States) NASA	7 December 1995 – 21 September 2003	orbiter	success	also flew by various of Jupiter's moons; intentionally flown into Jupiter at end of mission; first spacecraft to orbit Jupiter; first spacecraft to flyby an asteroid		1989-084B
Galileo Probe	(United States) NASA	7 December 1995	atmospheric probe	success	first probe to enter Jupiter's atmosphere		1989-084E
Cassini	(United States) NASA/ (Europe) ESA/ (Italy) ASI	December 2000	flyby	success	gravity assist en route to Saturn		1997-061A
Ulysses (second pass)	(Europe) ESA/ (United States) NASA	2003–04	distant flyby	success			1990-090B
New Horizons	(United States) NASA	28 February 2007	flyby	success	gravity assist en route to Pluto		2006-001A
Juno	(United States) NASA	5 July 2016 – July 2018, extended to July 2021 and then September 2025	orbiter	success	First solar-powered Jupiter orbiter, first mission to achieve a polar orbit of Jupiter.		2011-040A
Juice	(Europe) ESA	14 April 2023 (launch)	orbiter	en route	mission to study Jupiter's three icy moons Callisto, Europa and Ganymede, eventually orbiting Ganymede as the first spacecraft to orbit a satellite of another planet.		
Europa Clipper	(United States) NASA	14 October 2024 (launch); 11 April 2030 (planned)	orbiter	en route	planned to orbit Jupiter and fly by Europa multiple times		EUROPA-CL

=== Ganymede probes ===
Spacecraft	Organization	Date	Type	Status	Notes	Image	Ref
Juice	(Europe) ESA	14 April 2023 (launch)	orbiter	en route	mission to study Jupiter's three icy moons Callisto, Europa and Ganymede, eventually orbiting Ganymede as the first spacecraft to orbit a satellite of another planet.		

== Saturn probes ==
Spacecraft	Organization	Date	Type	Status	Notes	Image	Ref
Pioneer 11	(United States) NASA	1 September 1979	flyby	success	previously visited Jupiter		1973-019A
Voyager 1	(United States) NASA	12 November 1980	flyby	success	previously visited Jupiter		1977-084A
Voyager 2	(United States) NASA	5 August 1981	flyby	success	previously visited Jupiter, went on to visit Uranus and Neptune		1977-076A
Cassini	(United States) NASA/ (Europe) ESA/ (Italy) ASI	1 July 2004 – 15 September 2017	orbiter	success	also performed flybys of a number of Saturn's moons, and deployed the Huygens Titan lander; first spacecraft to orbit Saturn		1997-061A

=== Titan probes ===
Spacecraft	Organization	Date	Type	Status	Notes	Image	Ref
Huygens	(Europe) ESA	14 January 2005	atmospheric probe, lander	success	deployed by Cassini; first probe to land on a satellite of another planet		1997-061C

== Uranus probes ==
Spacecraft	Organization	Date	Type	Status	Notes	Image	Ref
Voyager 2	(United States) NASA	24 January 1986	flyby	success	previously visited Jupiter and Saturn; went on to visit Neptune		1977-076A

== Neptune probes ==
Spacecraft	Organization	Date	Type	Status	Notes	Image	Ref
Voyager 2	(United States) NASA	25 August 1989	flyby	success	previously visited Jupiter, Saturn and Uranus		1977-076A

== Pluto probes ==
Spacecraft	Organization	Date	Type	Status	Notes	Image	Ref
New Horizons	(United States) NASA	14 July 2015	flyby	success	later flew by Kuiper belt object 486958 Arrokoth when it was 43.4 AU from the Sun.		2006-001A

== Comet probes ==
Target	Spacecraft	Organization	Date	Type	Status	Notes	Image	Ref
21P/Giacobini-Zinner	ICE (formerly ISEE3)	(United States) NASA	11 September 1985	flyby	success	previously solar monitor ISEE3; went on to observe Halley's Comet		1978-079A
1P/Halley	Vega 1	(Soviet Union) SAS	6 March 1986	flyby	success	minimum distance 8,890 km; previously visited Venus		1984-125A
1P/Halley	Suisei	(Japan) ISAS	8 March 1986	flyby	success	151,000 km		1985-073A
1P/Halley	Vega 2	(Soviet Union) SAS	9 March 1986	flyby	success	minimum distance 8,890 km; previously visited Venus		1984-128A
1P/Halley	Sakigake	(Japan) ISAS	March 1986	distant flyby	partial success	minimum distance 6.99 million km		1985-001A
1P/Halley	Giotto	(Europe) ESA	14 March 1986	flyby	success	minimum distance 596 km; went on to visit comet 26P/Grigg–Skjellerup		1985-056A
1P/Halley	ICE (formerly ISEE3)	(United States) NASA	28 March 1986	distant obser- vations	success	minimum distance 32 million km; previously visited comet 21P/Giacobini–Zinner		1978-079A
26P/Grigg–Skjellerup	Giotto	(Europe) ESA	10 July 1992	flyby	success	previously visited Halley's Comet		1985-056A
45P/ Honda–Mrkos–Pajdusakova	Sakigake	(Japan) ISAS	1996	flyby	failure	contact lost; previously visited Halley's Comet		1985-001A
21P/Giacobini-Zinner	Sakigake	(Japan) ISAS	1998	flyby	failure	contact lost; previously visited Halley's Comet		1985-001A
55P/Tempel-Tuttle	Suisei	(Japan) ISAS	1998	flyby	failure	abandoned due to lack of fuel; previously visited Halley's Comet		1985-073A
21P/Giacobini-Zinner	Suisei	(Japan) ISAS	1998	flyby	failure	abandoned due to lack of fuel; previously visited Halley's Comet		1985-073A
107P/Wilson-Harrington	Deep Space 1	(United States) NASA	January 2001	flyby	failure	abandoned due to problems with the star tracker, but was re-tasked to fly by comet 19P/Borrelly		1998-061A
19P/Borrelly	Deep Space 1	(United States) NASA	22 September 2001	flyby	success	previously visited asteroid 9969 Braille		1998-061A
2P/Encke	CONTOUR	(United States) NASA	2003	flyby	failure	contact lost shortly after launch		2002-034A
81P/Wild	Stardust	(United States) NASA	2 January 2004	flyby, sample return	success	sample returned January 2006; also visited asteroid 5535 Annefrank		1999-003A
9P/Tempel	Deep Impact	(United States) NASA	July 2005	flyby	success			2005-001A
9P/Tempel	Impactor	(United States) NASA	4 July 2005	impactor	success			2005-001A
73P/ Schwassmann-Wachmann	CONTOUR	(United States) NASA	2006	flyby	failure	contact lost shortly after launch		2002-034A
6P/d'Arrest	CONTOUR	(United States) NASA	2008	flyby	failure	contact lost shortly after launch		2002-034A
103P/Hartley	Deep Impact (redesignated EPOXI)	(United States) NASA	4 November 2010	flyby	success	mission extension (target changed from comet Boethin)		2005-001A
9P/Tempel	Stardust (redesignated NExT)	(United States) NASA	14 February 2011	flyby	success	mission extension		1999-003A
67P/Churyumov– Gerasimenko	Rosetta	(Europe) ESA	6 August 2014 – 30 September 2016	orbiter	success	flybys of asteroids 2867 Šteins and 21 Lutetia completed; intentionally impacted at end of mission		2004-006A
67P/Churyumov– Gerasimenko	Philae	(Europe) ESA	12 November 2014 – 9 July 2015	lander	success			2004-006C
311P/PANSTARRS	Tianwen-2 (ZhengHe)	(China) CNSA	29 May 2025 (launch); 24 January 2035 (orbit)	orbiter, lander	en route	study of an asteroid/main-belt comet		2025-114A

== Kuiper belt probes ==
Target	Spacecraft	Organization	Date	Type	Status	Notes	Image	Ref
486958 Arrokoth	New Horizons	(United States) NASA	1 January 2019	flyby	success	extended mission after Pluto; may flyby another object in 2020s.		2006-001A

== Probes leaving the Solar System ==
Spacecraft	Organization	Status	Notes	Image	Ref
Pioneer 10	(United States) NASA	success	Left Jupiter in December 1973. Mission ended March 1997. Last contact 23 January 2003. Craft now presumed to lack sufficient power for antenna.		1972-012A
Pioneer 11	(United States) NASA	success	Left Saturn in September 1979. Last contact September 1995. The craft's antenna cannot be maneuvered to point to Earth. Craft now presumed to lack sufficient power for antenna.		1973-019A
Voyager 1	(United States) NASA	success	Left Saturn in November 1980. Still in regular contact and transmitting scientific data.		1977-084A
Voyager 2	(United States) NASA	success	Left Neptune in August 1989. Still in regular contact and transmitting scientific data.		1977-076A
New Horizons	(United States) NASA	success	Left Pluto 14 July 2015; flew by Kuiper belt object 486958 Arrokoth on 1 January 2019 when it was 43.4 AU from the Sun.		2006-001A

== Other probes to leave Earth orbit ==
For completeness, this section lists probes that have left (or will leave) Earth orbit, but are not primarily targeted at any of the above bodies.

Spacecraft	Organization	Date	Type	Status	Notes	Image	Ref
WMAP	(United States) NASA	30 June 2001 (launch) – October 2010 (end)	Sun-Earth L2 point	success	cosmic background radiation observations; sent to graveyard orbit after 9 years of use.		2001-027A
Spitzer Space Telescope	(United States) NASA	25 August 2003 (launch) – 30 January 2020 (end)	Earth-trailing heliocentric orbit	success	infrared astronomy		2003-038A
Kepler	(United States) NASA	6 March 2009 (launch) - 2018	Earth-trailing heliocentric orbit	success	search for extrasolar planets		2009-011A
Herschel Space Observatory	(Europe) ESA	14 May 2009 (launch)	Lissajous orbit around Sun-Earth L2 point	success	study of formation and evolution of galaxies and stars		2009-026A
Planck	(Europe) ESA	14 May 2009 (launch) - 2013	Lissajous orbit around Sun-Earth L2 point	success	cosmic microwave background observations		2009-026B
IKAROS	(Japan) JAXA	20 May 2010 (launch)	Earth-Venus transfer heliocentric orbit	success	solar sail technology development / interplanetary space exploration		2010-020E
DCAM2	(Japan) JAXA	20 May 2010 (launch) (released on 14 June 2010)	Earth-Venus transfer heliocentric orbit	success	imaged Ikaros in deep space		2010-020J
DCAM1	(Japan) JAXA	20 May 2010 (launch) (released on 19 June 2010)	Earth-Venus transfer heliocentric orbit	success	imaged Ikaros in deep space		2010-020K
Shin'en (UNITEC-1)	(Japan) UNISEC	20 May 2010 (launch)	Earth-Venus transfer heliocentric orbit	failure	technology development; contact lost shortly after launch		2010-020F
Chang'e 2	(China) CNSA	25 August 2011 (arrive) – 15 April 2012 (end)	Sun-Earth L2 point	success	Left the point on 15 April 2012, then flew by asteroid 4179 Toutatis		2010-050A
Gaia	(Europe) ESA	19 December 2013 (launch)	Lissajous orbit around Sun-Earth L2 point	success	astrometry mission to measure the position and motion of 1 billion stars		2013-074A
Shin'en 2	(Japan) Kyushu Institute of Technology	3 December 2014 (launch)	heliocentric orbit	success	amateur radio satellite / material demonstration		2014-076B
ARTSAT2:DESPATCH	(Japan) Tama Art University	3 December 2014 (launch)	heliocentric orbit	success	deep space artwork / amateur radio satellite		2014-076C
LISA Pathfinder	(Europe) ESA	3 December 2015 (launch) – 30 June 2017 (end)	Halo orbit around Sun-Earth L1 point	success	test mission for proposed LISA gravitational wave observatory		2015-070A
Spektr-RG	(Russia) (Germany)	13 July 2019 (launch)	Halo orbit around Sun-Earth L2 point	operational	X-ray astronomy		2019-040A
Chang'e 5	(China) CNSA	23 November 2020 (launch) - 30 August 2021 (left L1)	Halo orbit about Sun-Earth L1 point	success	test mission post lunar sample return		2020-087A
James Webb Space Telescope	(United States) NASA (Europe) ESA (Canada) CSA	25 December 2021 (launch)	Sun-Earth L2 point	in orbit	infrared astronomy		2021-130A
ArgoMoon	(Italy) ASI	16 November 2022 (launch)	High Earth Orbit with Lunar Flybys (heliocentric)	in orbit	image the ICPS and perform deep space Nanotechnology experiments.		ARGOMOON
BioSentinel	(United States) NASA	16 November 2022 (launch)	heliocentric orbit	in orbit	it contains yeast cards that will be rehydrated in space, designed to detect, measure, and compare the effects of deep space radiation.		BIOSENTNL
Team Miles	(United States) Fluid & Reason	16 November 2022 (launch)	heliocentric orbit	failure	demonstrate low-thrust plasma propulsion in deep space. Deployed, but contact was not established.		TEAMMILES
CuSP	(United States) NASA	16 November 2022	heliocentric orbit	failure	study particles and magnetic fields.		CUSP
Euclid	(Europe) ESA	1 July 2023 (launch)	Halo orbit around Sun-Earth L2 point	enroute	measure the rate of expansion of the Universe through time to better understand dark energy and dark matter		
Chang'e 6	(China) CNSA	3 May 2024 (launch)	Halo orbit about Sun-Earth L2 point	success	on extended test mission post lunar sample return		CHANG-E-6
IMAP	(United States) NASA	24 September 2025 (launch)	Halo orbit around Sun-Earth L1 point	operational	Heliophysics		2025-215A
Carruthers Geocorona Observatory	(United States) NASA	24 September 2025 (launch)	Halo orbit around Sun-Earth L1 point	operational	ultraviolet observations of Earth		2025-215C
Roman Space Telescope	(United States) NASA	30 August 2026 (launch)	Halo orbit around Sun-Earth L2 point	operational	visible and near-infrared astronomy		2026-199A

== See also ==
- Lists of spacecraft
- List of uncrewed spacecraft by program
- Discovery and exploration of the Solar System
- List of space telescopes
- Sample return mission
- Timeline of Solar System exploration
- List of interplanetary voyages
- List of missions to the outer planets
