= Flyby (spaceflight) =

Flight event at some distance from the object

Flyby of comet Hartley 2 on Nov. 4, 2010 (EPOXI mission)

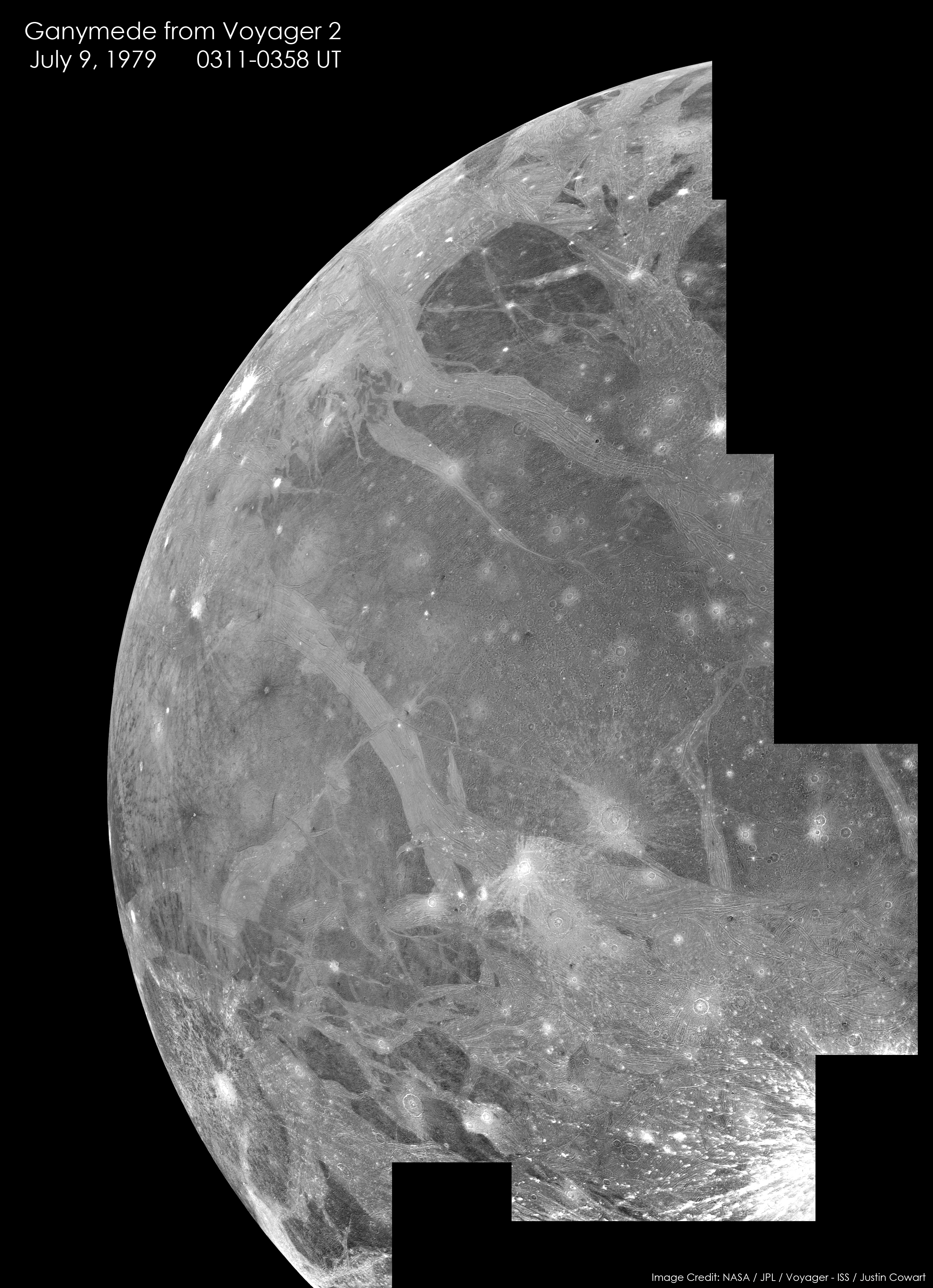
Imagery collected by Voyager 2 of Ganymede during its flyby of the Jovian system

A flyby (/ˈflaɪbaɪ/) is a spaceflight operation in which a spacecraft passes near another body, which is usually a target of the space exploration mission and may also be a source of a gravity assist to impel it towards another target in a swing-by.

The term has also been used to describe the passing of bodies to Earth, as of asteroids. Important parameters are the time and distance of closest approach.

== Spacecraft flyby ==
Flyby maneuvers can be conducted with a planet, a natural satellite or a non-planetary object such as a small Solar System body.

Planetary flybys have occurred with Mars or Earth:

- List of Earth flybys
- Mars flyby

An example of a comet flyby is when International Cometary Explorer (formerly ISEE-3) passed about 4,800 miles (7,700 km) from the nucleus of Comet Giacobini-Zinner in September 1985.

Another application of the flyby is of Earth's Moon, usually called a lunar flyby. The Apollo 13 spacecraft had an exploded oxygen tank, and therefore had to flyby around the Moon. The Artemis II mission included a lunar flyby.

=== Mars ===
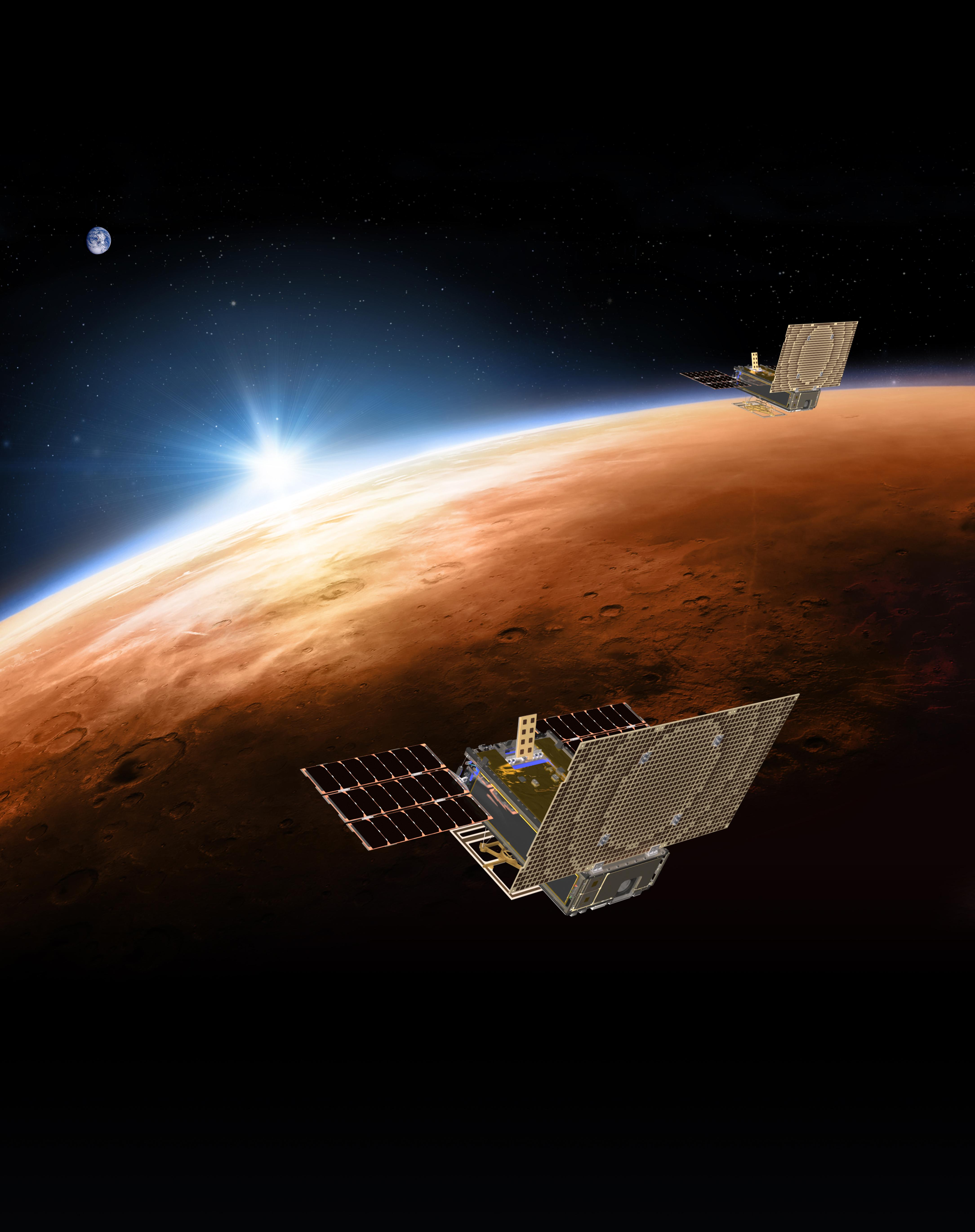
Illustration of the MarCO 6U cubesat relay flyby probes and technology demonstrators for the Mars InSight lander; the flybys provided relay communication support during the landing in 2018

With regard to Mars flybys, a related concept is a Mars flyby rendezvous, where a spacecraft does not enter orbit but rendezvouses before or after a flyby of the planet with another spacecraft. A flyby rendezvous with Mars was evaluated at NASA's Manned Spacecraft Center in the 1960s. At that time NASA developed designs for a combination of a Mars lander, short-stay surface habitat, and ascent vehicle called a Mars Excursion Module (MEM); the ascent stage performed the rendezvous with a different spacecraft that did a flyby of Mars without entering orbit or landing. Compared to MOR, a flyby rendezvous means one spacecraft does not have to orbit Mars, so the resources needed for a return journey to Earth are not taken in and out of Mars orbit, for example. (See also Mars cycler)

Mariner IV's flyby of Mars in July 1965 returned more accurate atmospheric data about Mars, and much closer views of its surface than previously.

The Mariner 6 and Mariner 7 flyby of Mars in 1969 resulted in another breakthrough in knowledge about the planet. The Mariner 6 & 7 infrared radiometer results from the flyby showed that the atmosphere of Mars was composed mostly of carbon dioxide (CO_{2}), and they were also able to detect trace amounts of water on the surface of Mars.

Rosetta, swung by around Mars at a distance of 250 km and performed a gravity assist. This is the closest flyby of Mars to date.

In 2018, the twin Mars Cube One performed a flyby to relay communication for InSight lander EDL (they were launched towards Mars with the cruise stage carrying the InSight lander). Both MarCOs reached Mars, and successfully relayed data during the Entry, Descent, and Landing phase of Insight on November 26, 2018.

Meanwhile, Tianwen-1 Deployable Camera, imaged Tianwen-1 during its transit to Mars in September 2020, and made a flyby of Mars around 10 February 2021 according to its trajectory thought for Mars, before entering deep space or a solar orbit.

=== Kuiper belt ===
On the night of December 31, 2018 to the morning of January 1, 2019 New Horizons performed the most distant flyby to date of the Kuiper belt object Arrokoth. New Horizons previously did a flyby of Pluto in July 2015, and that was at about 32.9 AU (astronomical units) from the Sun, while the New Year's Day 2019 flyby of the Kuiper belt object Arrokoth was at 43.6 AU.

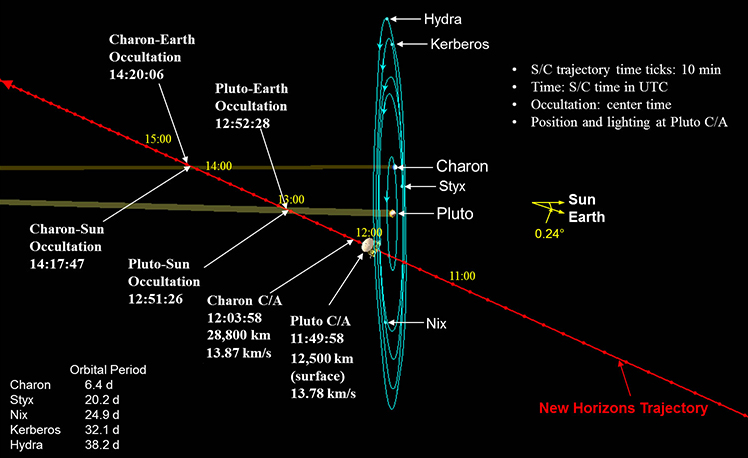
Diagram of the trajectory of New Horizons during its flyby of Pluto

=== Cassini ===
Animation of Cassini's trajectory around Saturn from 1 May 2004 to 15 September 2017, which included flybys of several moons of Saturn Cassini · Saturn · Enceladus · Titan · Iapetus

Cassini-Huygens (launched 1997), which orbited Saturn (from 2004–2017) performed flybys of many of Saturn's moons including Titan. Cassini-Huygen's had its first flyby of Titan in October 2004. For further examples of Cassini flybys of Saturn's moons see Timeline of Cassini-Huygens.

Cassini conducted many flybys at various distances of the moons of Saturn. It achieved 126 flybys of Titan, and its final close flyby was on April 22, 2017 prior to its retirement.

=== Comets ===
International Cometary Explorer (ISEE-3) passed through the plasma tail of comet Giacobini-Zinner performing a flyby at a distance of 7,800 km (4,800 mi) from the nucleus on September 11, 1985.

In 2010, the Deep Impact spacecraft on the EPOXI mission did a flyby of comet Hartley 2.

== Natural flyby ==
During an asteroid flyby of Earth, sometimes they are imaged by radar. Animation of (671294) 2014 JO25, which had an Earth flyby in 2017

Flyby is also sometimes loosely used to describe when, for example, an asteroid approaches and coasts by the Earth.

This was also the term for when a comet did a flyby of Mars in 2014.

P/2016 BA14 was radar imaged at distance of 2.2 million miles (3,500,000 km) from Earth in 2016, during its flyby. This enabled the size of the nucleus to be calculated to about 3,300 feet (1 km) in diameter.

On December 16, 2018 the short period comet 46P/Wirtanen had its closest approach of Earth, coming within 7.1 million miles or 11.4 million kilometres (one of its closest approaches to Earth). NASA researcher Michael DiSanti said the comet's flyby will allow detailed studies of what it is made of as more of the comet's nucleus becomes exposed to sunlight.

== See also ==
- Aerobraking
- Aerogravity assist
- Apsis
- Deliberate crash landings on extraterrestrial bodies ('fly-in')
- Flight dynamics (spacecraft)
- List of asteroid close approaches to Earth
- Orbital spaceflight
- Space rendezvous
