= Mars Cube One =

2018 Mars flyby mission

Mars Cube One (A & B)
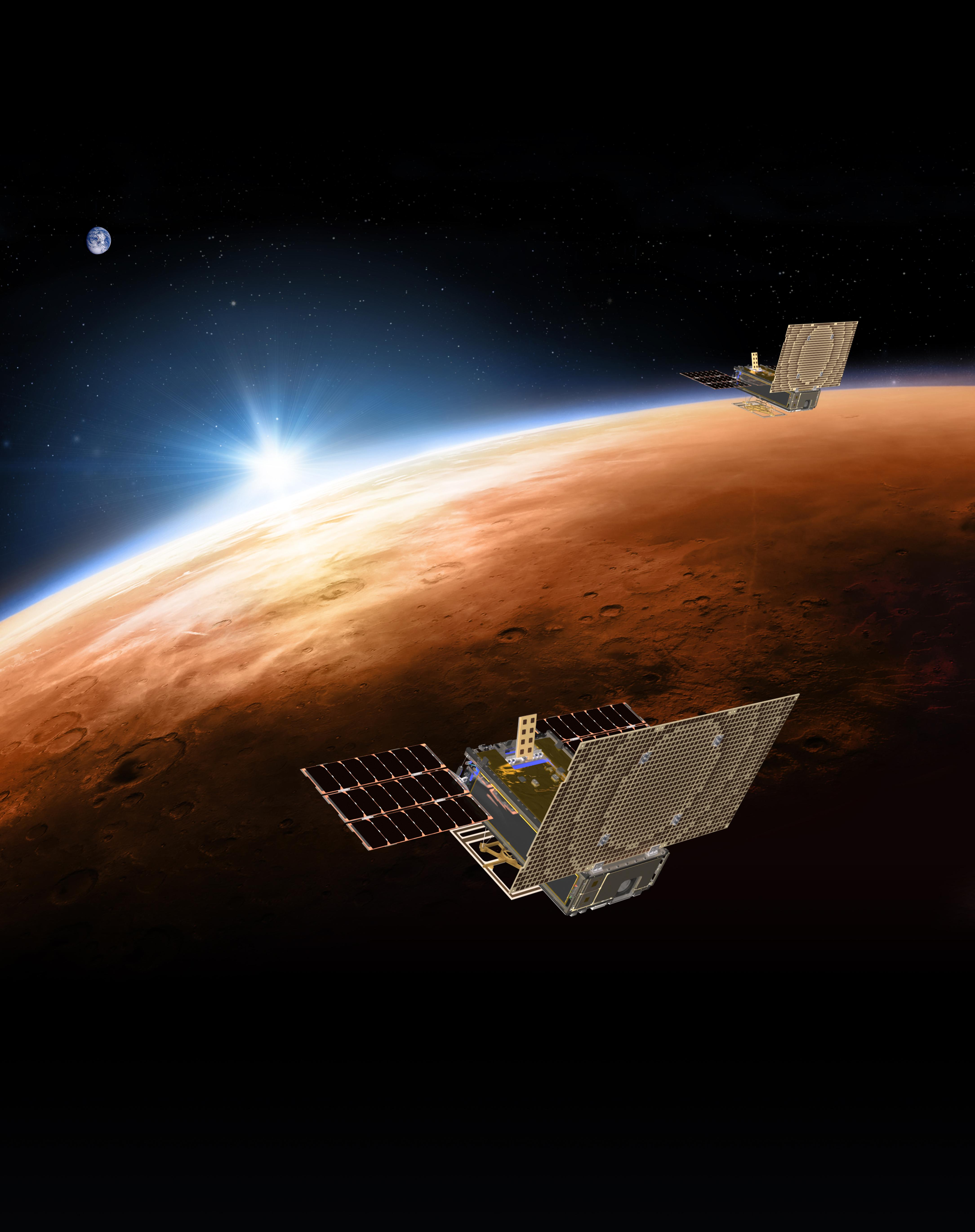
- Artist's impression of MarCO spacecraft
- Mission type: Communications relay test Mars flyby
- Operator: NASA
- Website: www.jpl.nasa.gov/cubesat/missions/marco.php
- Mission duration: MARCO A: 7 months and 30 days MARCO B: 7 months and 24 days

Spacecraft properties
- Spacecraft type: 6U CubeSat
- Manufacturer: JPL
- Launch mass: 13.5 kg (30 lb) each

Start of mission
- Launch date: 5 May 2018, 11:05 UTC
- Rocket: Atlas V 401
- Launch site: Vandenberg Air Force Base SLC-3E
- Contractor: United Launch Alliance

End of mission
- Disposal: Abandoned In Solar Orbit
- Declared: 2 February 2020
- Last contact: MarCO-A: 4 January 2019; MarCO-B: 29 December 2018

Orbital parameters
- Reference system: heliocentric

Flyby of Mars
- Closest approach: 26 November 2018, 19:52:59 UTC
- Distance: 3,500 km (2,200 mi)
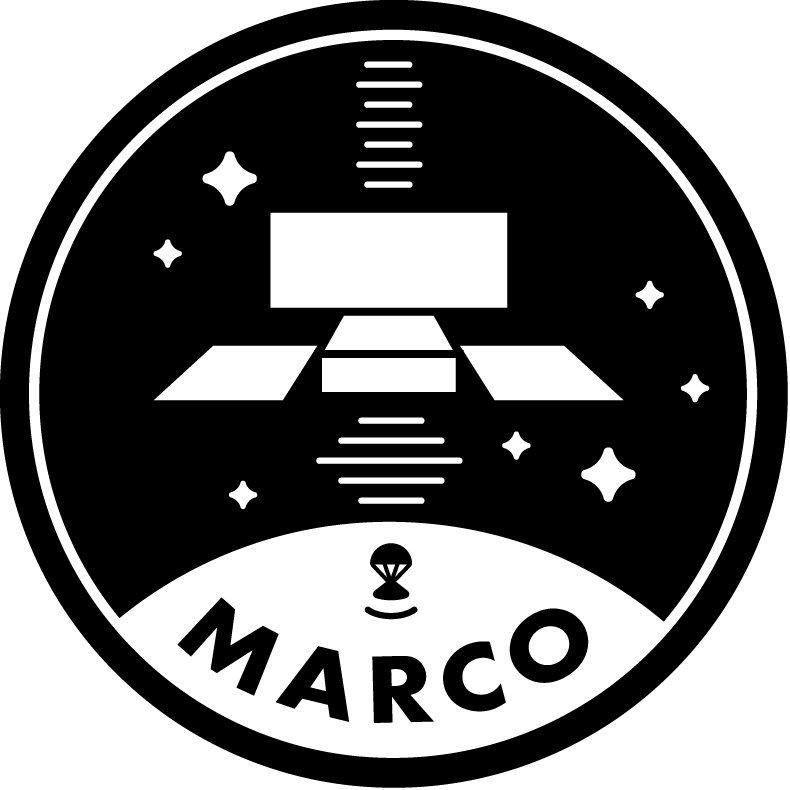
- Discovery program

Mars Cube One (or MarCO) was a Mars flyby mission launched on 5 May 2018 alongside NASA's InSight Mars lander. It consisted of two nanospacecraft, MarCO-A and MarCO-B, that provided real-time communications to Earth for InSight during its entry, descent, and landing (EDL) on 26 November 2018 - when InSight was out of line of sight from the Earth. Both spacecraft were 6U CubeSats designed to test miniaturized communications and navigation technologies. These were the first CubeSats to operate beyond Earth orbit, and aside from telecommunications they also tested CubeSats' endurance in deep space. On 5 February 2019, NASA reported that both the CubeSats had gone silent by 5 January 2019, and are unlikely to be heard from again. In August 2019, the CubeSats were honored for their role in the successful landing of the InSight lander on Mars.

The InSight lander re-transmitted its telemetry data during the landing, which demonstrated the new relay system and technology for future use in missions to other Solar System bodies. This provided an alternative to the orbiters for relaying information and achieved a technology development threshold.

After the MarCO satellites went silent in January 2019, there was a chance that communications with the satellites could be reestablished in the second half of 2019 as the satellites moved into more favorable location in space. NASA launched a campaign to establish communication with the satellites in September 2019. The communication attempts were unsuccessful and on 2 February 2020 NASA announced Mars Cube One mission formally ended.

== Overview ==
Mars Cube One is the first spacecraft built to the CubeSat form to operate beyond Earth orbit for a deep space mission. CubeSats are made of small components that are desirable for multiple reasons, including low cost of construction, quick development, simple systems, and ease of deployment to low Earth orbit. They have been used for many research purposes, including: biological endeavors, mapping missions, etc. CubeSat technology was developed by California Polytechnic State University and Stanford University, with the purpose of quick and easy projects that would allow students to make use of the technology. They are often packaged as part of the payload for a larger mission, making them even more cost effective.

The two Mars Cube One spacecraft are identical and officially called MarCO-A and MarCO-B and were launched together for redundancy; they were nicknamed by JPL engineers as WALL-E and EVE in reference to the main characters in the animated film WALL-E. The MarCO mission cost was US$18.5 million.

JPL's MarCO engineers view the Mars flyby as a technology demonstration that could lead to many more low-cost, targeted small satellite missions outside of Earth's orbit. While keeping an eye on the performance of the MarCO mission, NASA has proposed spending more money on CubeSats as a complement to multi-billion-dollar projects which sometimes face years of delay.

== Launch and cruise ==
The launch of Mars Cube One was managed by NASA's Launch Services Program. The launch was scheduled for 4 March 2016 on an Atlas V 401, but the mission was postponed to 5 May 2018 after a major test failure of an InSight scientific instrument. The Atlas V rocket launched the spacecraft together with InSight, then the two MarCO separated soon after launch to fly their own trajectory to Mars in order to test CubeSats' endurance and navigation in deep space.

During the cruise phase, the two spacecraft were kept about 10,000 km (6,200 mi) away from InSight at either flank for safety, and the distance was reduced as the three spacecraft approached Mars. The closest flyby distance to Mars was 3,500 km (2,200 mi).

== Objectives ==
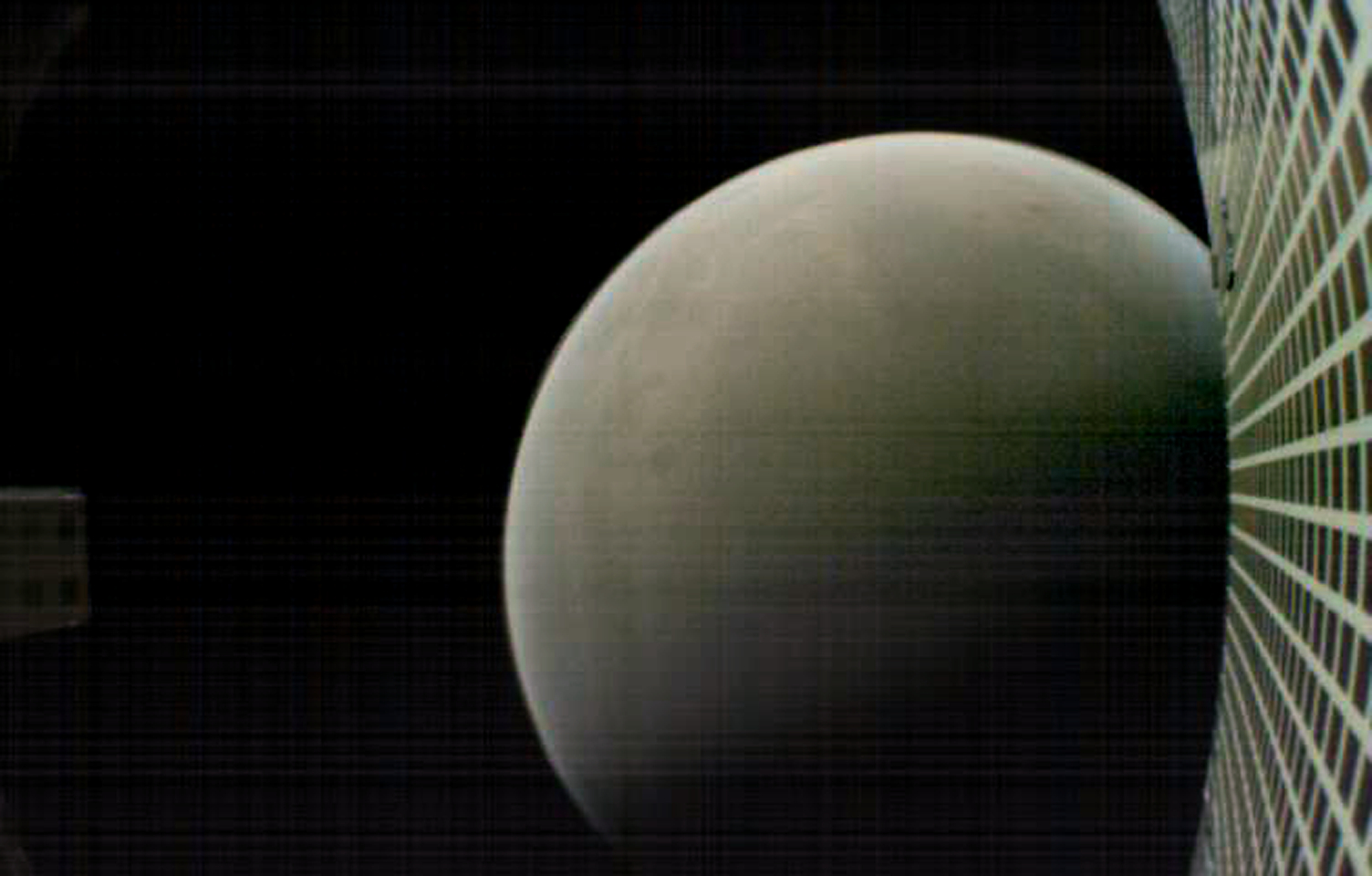
View of Mars from MarCO-B during its flyby on 26 November 2018. This image itself has provided useful atmospheric data.

The primary mission of MarCO is to test new miniaturized communication and navigation technologies. They were able to provide real-time communication relay while the InSight lander was in the entry, descent, landing (EDL) phase.

The MarCO spacecraft were launched as a pair (named WALL-E and EVE for the movie characters) for redundancy, and flew at either side of InSight. While there are a large number of CubeSats around Earth, Mars Cube One is the first CubeSat mission to go beyond Earth orbit. This allowed for collection of unique data outside of the Earth's atmosphere and orbit. In addition to serving as communications relays, they also tested the CubeSat components' endurance and navigation capabilities in deep space. Instead of waiting several hours for the information to relay back to Earth directly from the InSight lander, MarCO thus relayed EDL-critical data immediately, (subject only to the 8 minute Mars-Earth transmission time) after the completion of the landing. The information sent to Earth included an image from InSight of the Martian surface right after the lander touched down.

Without the MarCO CubeSats, InSight would relay the flight information to the Mars Reconnaissance Orbiter (MRO) which does not transmit information as quickly. Seeing the already-present difficulty in communicating with ground control during especially risky situations, various teams set out to revise the way in which data is relayed back to Earth. Previous missions would send data directly to Earth after landing, or to nearby orbiters, which would then relay the information. Future missions may no longer choose to rely on these methods, since CubeSats may be able to improve data relay in real time, as well as reduce the overall mission cost.

Views from MarCO

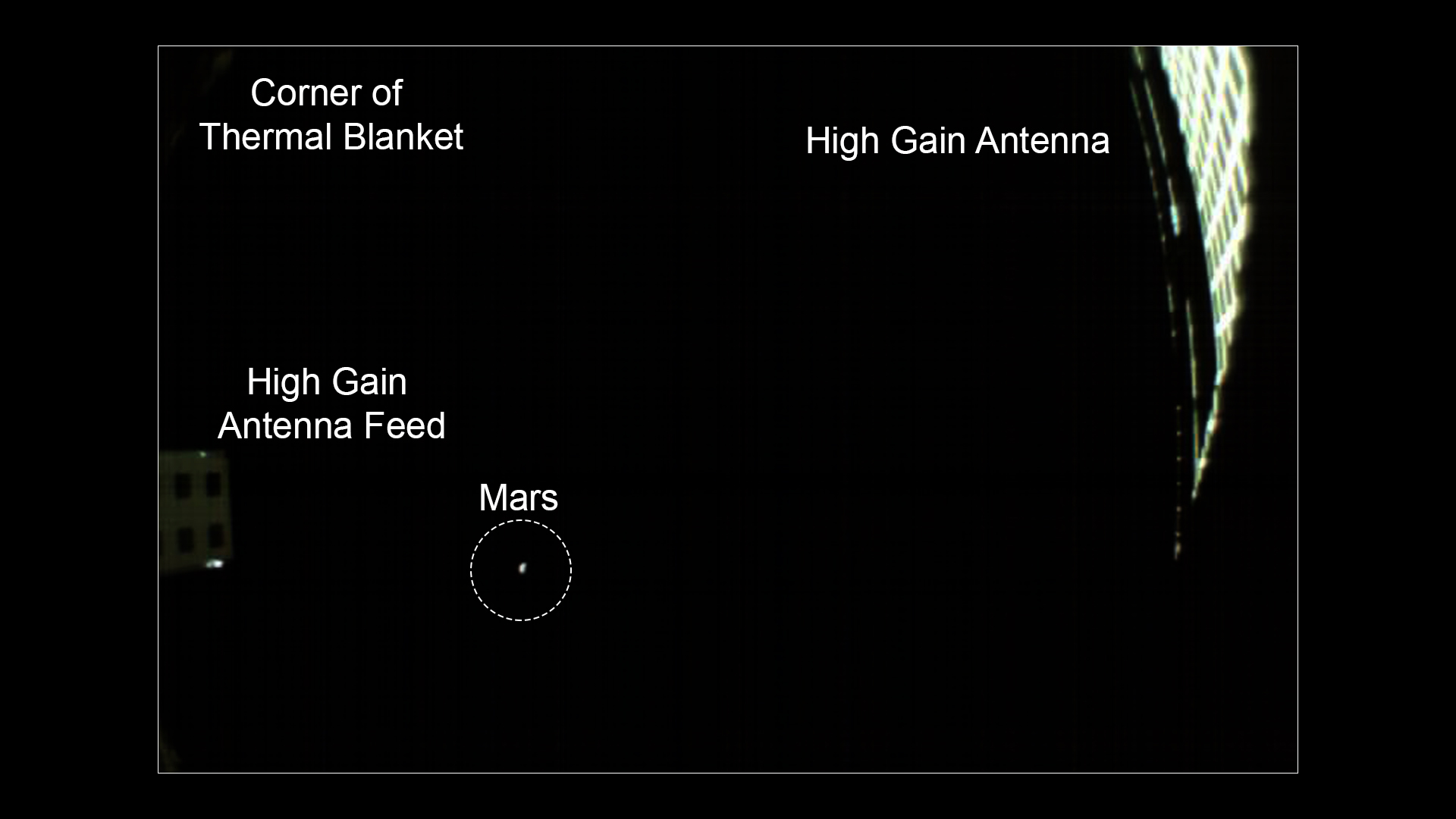
Mars (24 November 2018)

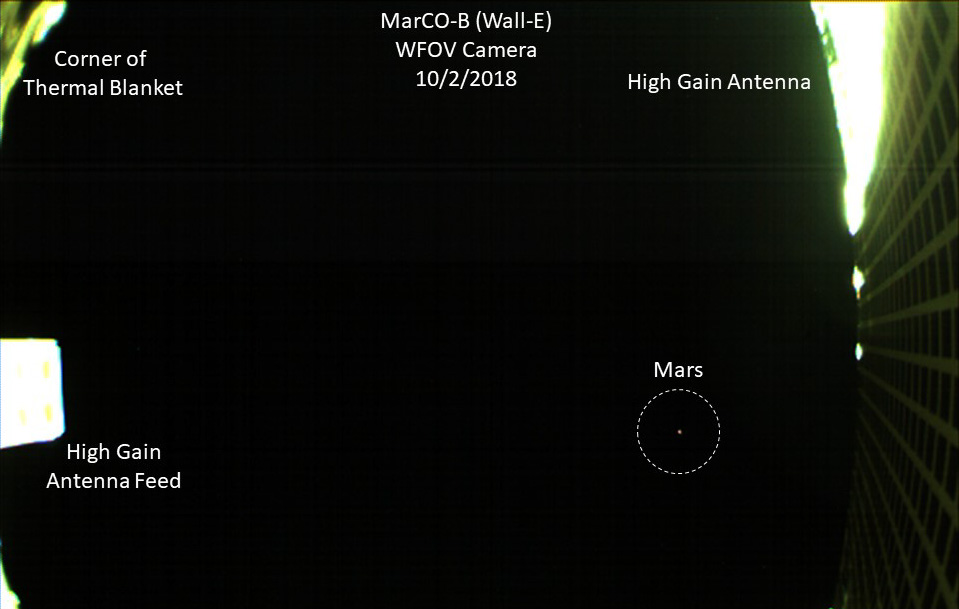
Mars (2 October 2018)

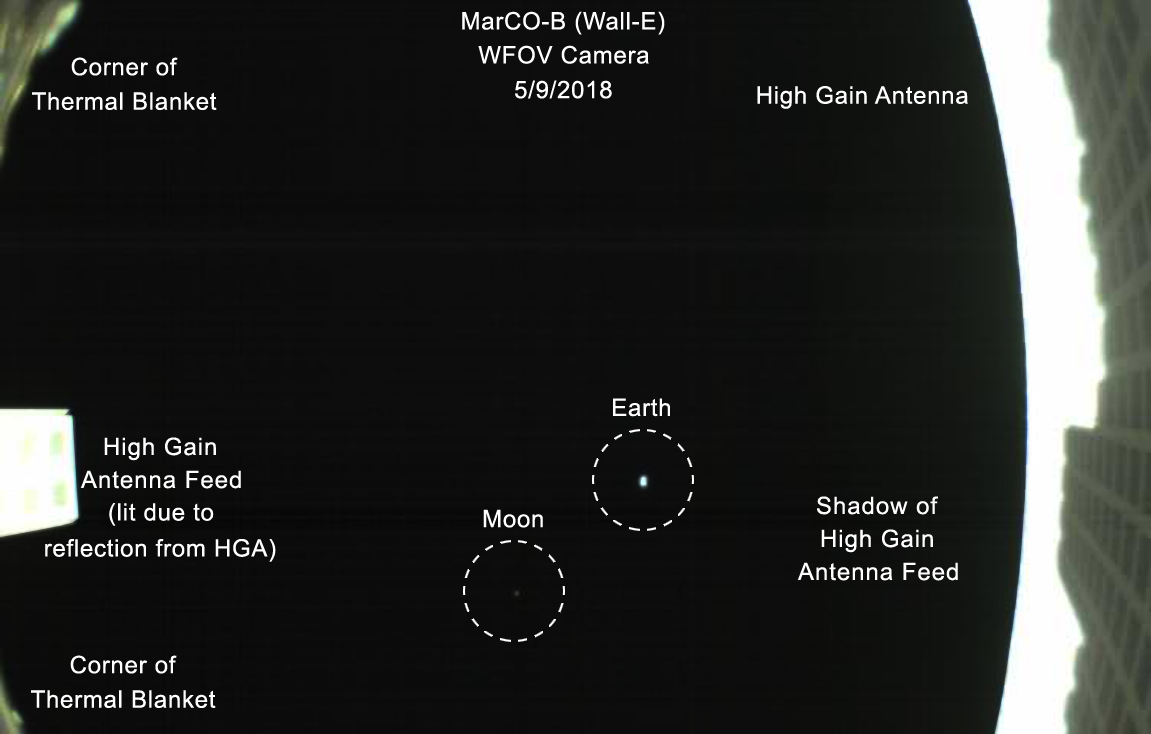
Earth and Moon (9 May 2018)

== Design and components ==
The design includes two communication-relay CubeSats, built by NASA's Jet Propulsion Laboratory, which are of the 6U specification (10×20×30 cm). A limiting factor to the development of CubeSats is that all necessary components must fit within the frame of the satellite. It must contain the antenna, avionics to control the satellite, a propulsion system, power, and payload.

=== Data relay ===
On board the two CubeSats is an ultra-high frequency (UHF) antenna with circular polarization. EDL information from InSight was transmitted through the UHF band at 8 kbit/s to the CubeSats, and was simultaneously retransmitted at an X band frequency at 8 kbit/s to Earth. MarCO used a deployable solar panel for power, but because of the limitations in solar panel efficiency, the power for the X-band frequency can only be about 5 watts.

For the CubeSats to relay information, they need a high gain antenna (HGA) which is reliable, meets the mass specs, has low complexity, and is affordable to build. A high gain antenna (directional antenna) is one that has a focused, narrow radiowave beamwidth. Three possible types were assessed: a standard microstrip patch antenna, a reflectarray, and a mesh reflector. With the small, flat, size required for the CubeSats, the reflectarray antenna type met all of the mission needs. The components of the reflectarray HGA are three folded panels, a root hinge which connects the wings to the body of the CubeSat, four wing hinges, and a burn wire release mechanism. The antenna panels must be able to withstand temperature changes throughout the mission as well as vibrations during deployment. MarCO relayed EDL-critical data immediately upon landing. These signals arrived on Earth eight minutes later.

=== Propulsion ===
The propulsion system features eight cold gas thrusters which control the trajectory, and a reaction control system to adjust their attitude (3D orientation). On the way to the correct transmission destination, the propulsion system made five small corrections to ensure the two small spacecraft were on the correct trajectory. Small changes in trajectory early on in the mission's deployment not only saved fuel but also the space which any extra fuel would have taken up, thus conserving volume for other important components inside the spacecraft. MarCO-B (WALL-E) had been leaking propellant gas almost since liftoff, but early assessments indicated it had enough to complete its mission.

Having completed their primary mission, the small spacecraft shall continue in their elliptical orbits around the Sun. Engineers expected them to keep working for a couple weeks after they pass Mars orbit, depending on how long their propellant and electronics last.

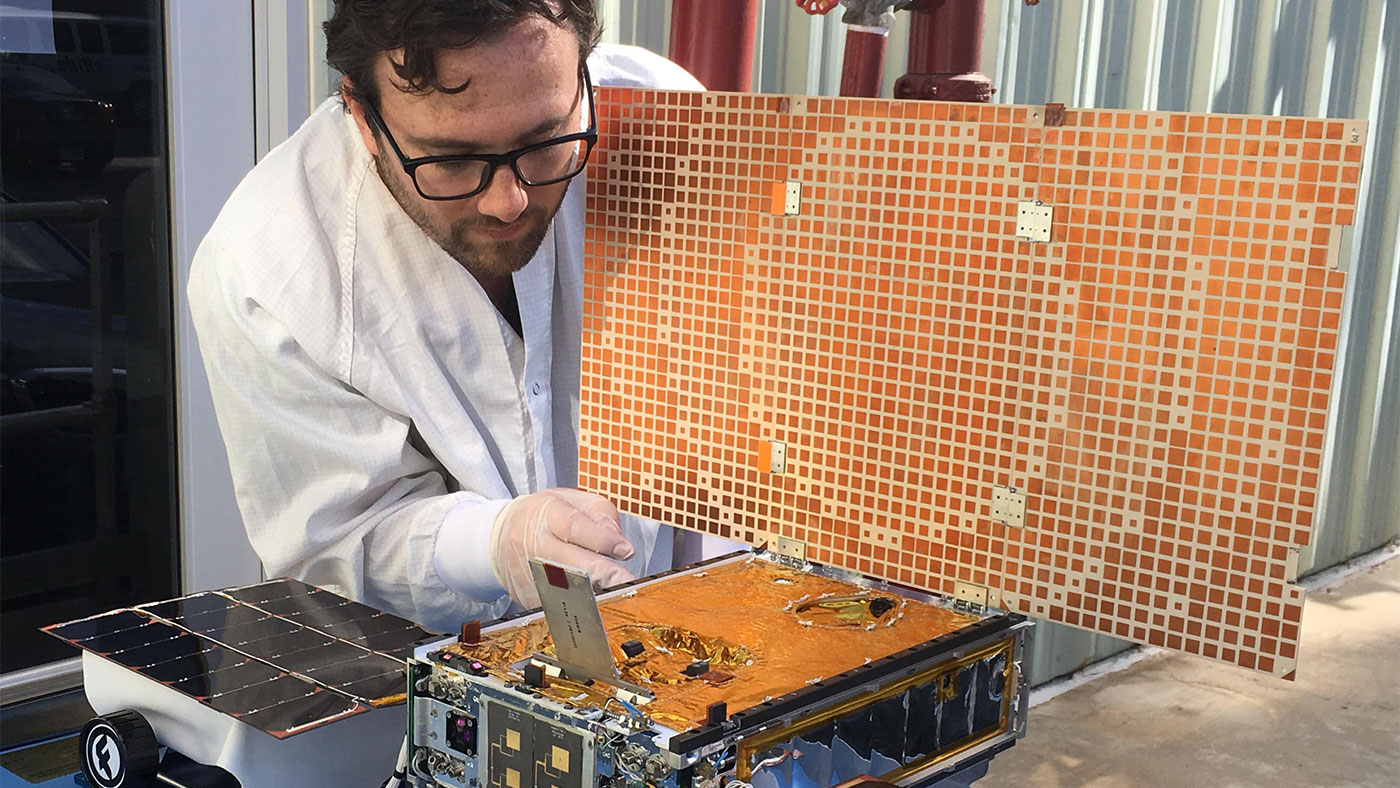
Marco Cubesat, showing the unfolded Reflectarray antenna

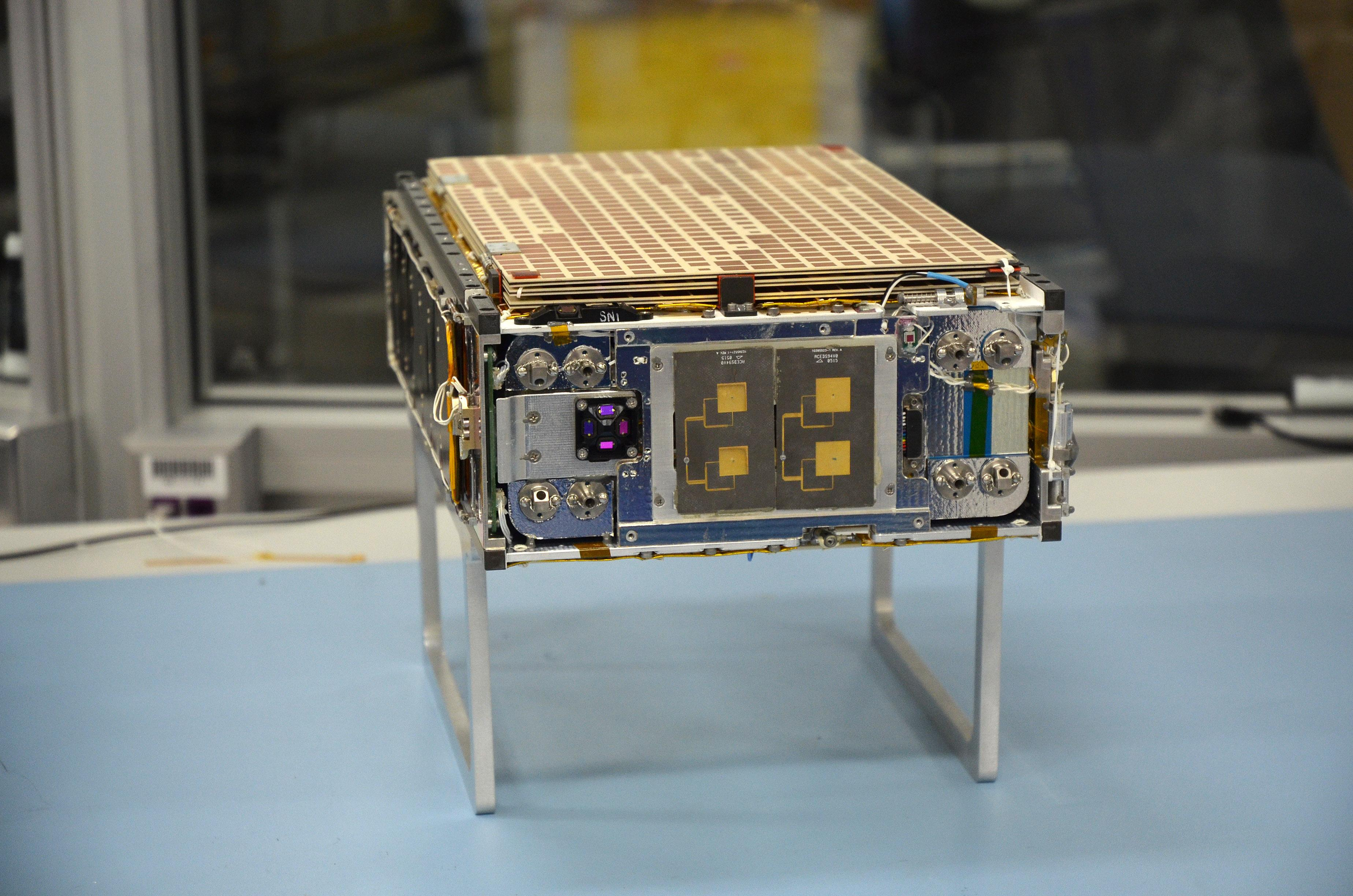
Flight hardware of a Mars Cube One (folded up)

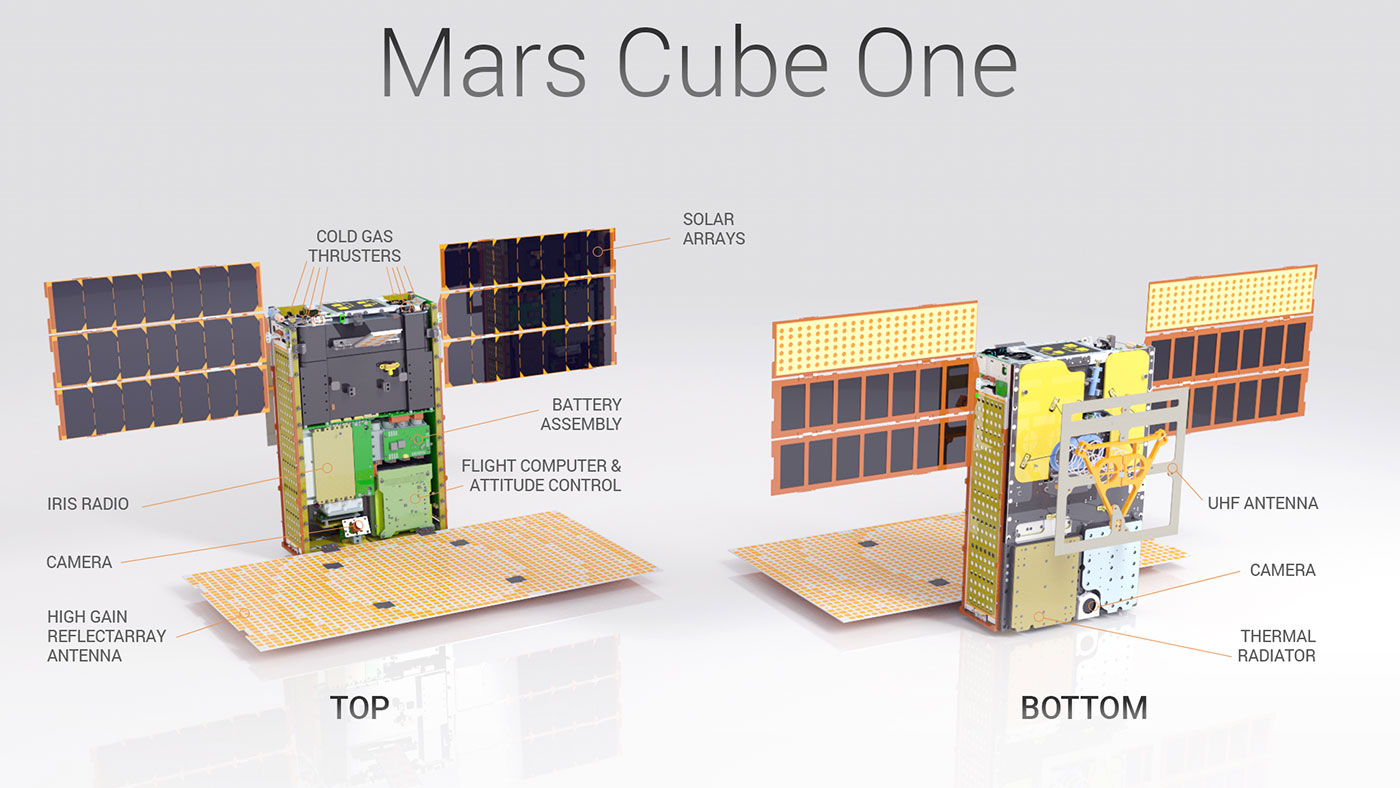
Overview of Marco satellite after unfolding

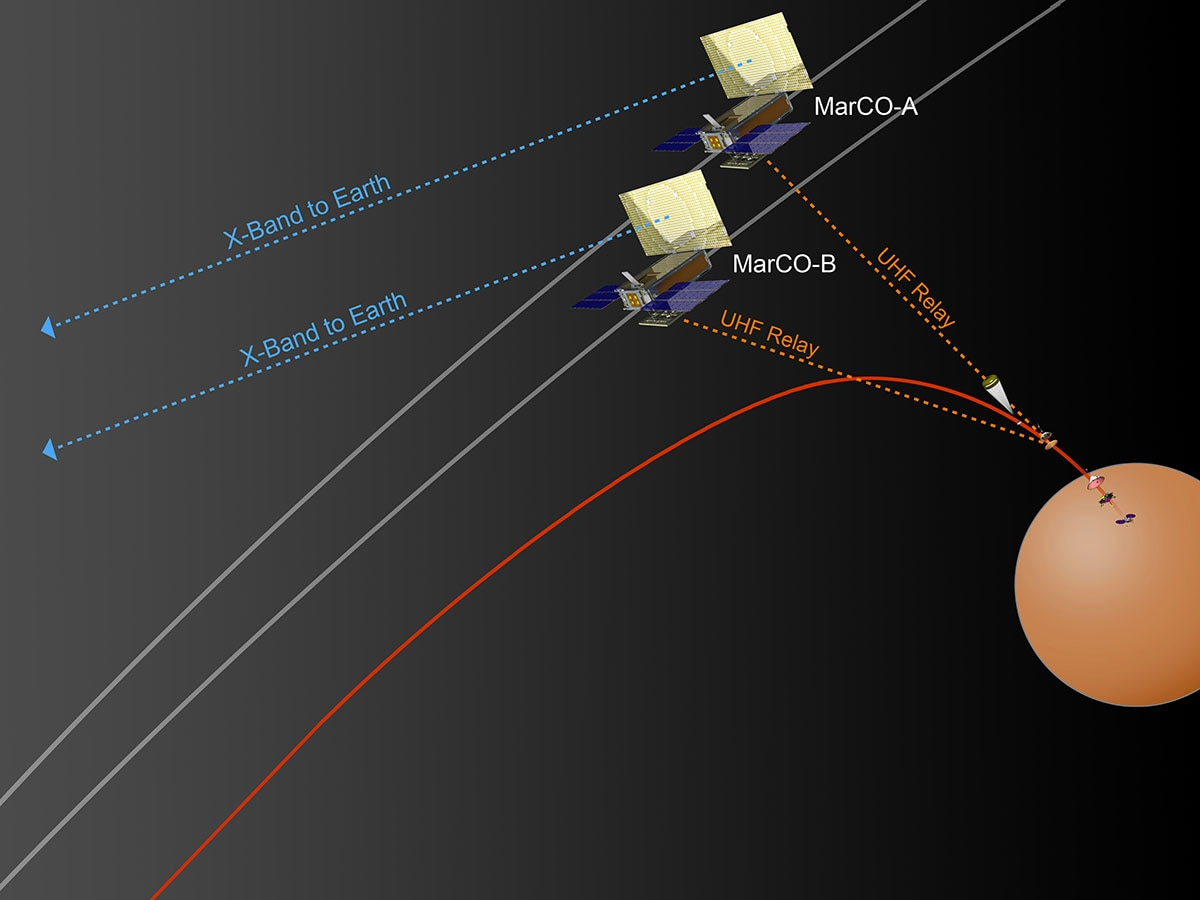
Illustration of MarCO's relay task

=== Communications, navigation, and imaging ===
Each MarCO carries a softball-sized radio used to communicate with the ground using X-band, to receive data from InSight using UHF, and to collect tracking measurements for navigation. Their attitude control system is equipped with a star tracker that is used to determine the attitude of the spacecraft. In addition, each MarCO carries a miniature wide-angle camera that is used to verify deployments and to capture outreach images.

== Similar missions beyond Earth orbit ==
The Artemis 1 mission to the Moon carried 10 CubeSats as secondary payloads. Each CubeSat was developed by a different team with different goals. In another mission, the LICIA CubeSat was carried by the Double Asteroid Redirection Test probe, which launched in November 2021. LICIA assisted DART by monitoring its impact with an asteroid.

== See also ==
- Curiosity rover
- Deep Space 2, another piggyback probe to Mars
- Exploration of Mars
- ExoMars, orbiter and rover
- Mars 3
- Mars Exploration Rover
- Mars Express orbiter
- Mars Reconnaissance Orbiter
- Mars Science Laboratory
- 2001 Mars Odyssey orbiter
