= Venera 2MV-1 No.1 =

Soviet spacecraft launched 1962

2MV-1 No.1
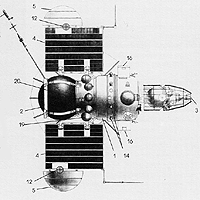
- Mission type: Venus lander
- Operator: OKB-1
- Harvard designation: 1962 Alpha Pi 1
- COSPAR ID: 1962-040A
- SATCAT no.: 372
- Mission duration: Launch failure

Spacecraft properties
- Spacecraft type: 2MV-1
- Manufacturer: OKB-1
- Launch mass: 890 kilograms (1,960 lb)
- Power: watts

Start of mission
- Launch date: 25 August 1962, 02:18:45 UTC
- Rocket: Molniya 8K78 s/n T103-12
- Launch site: Baikonur 1/5

End of mission
- Decay date: 28 August 1962

Orbital parameters
- Reference system: Geocentric
- Regime: Low Earth (achieved); Heliocentric (intended)
- Eccentricity: 0.00403
- Perigee altitude: 168 kilometres (104 mi)
- Apogee altitude: 221 kilometres (137 mi)
- Inclination: 64.9 degrees
- Period: 88.71 minutes
- Epoch: 25 August 1962

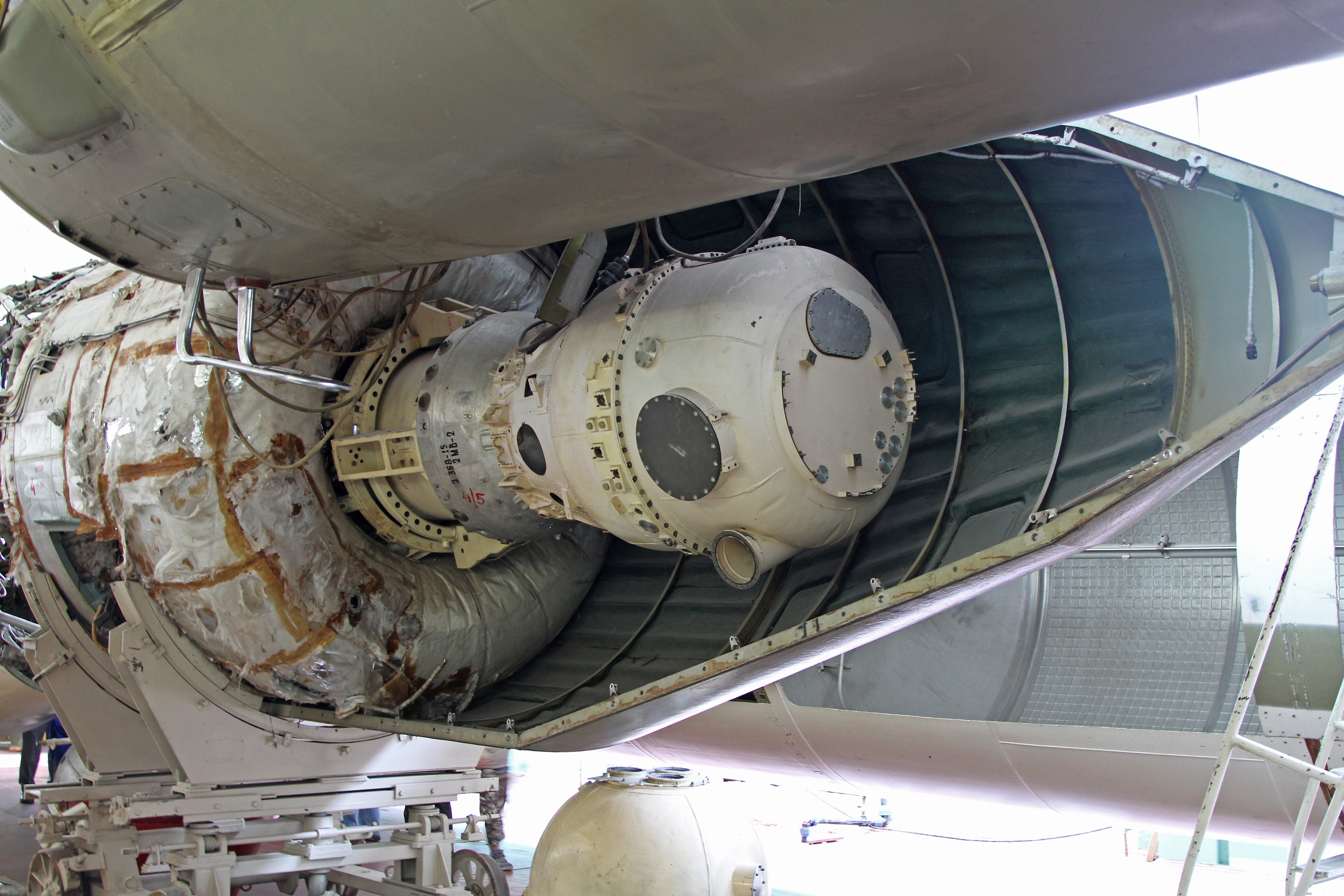
An image of a 2MV planetary probe. While it is unclear whether this is an image of the 2MV-1 No.1, the design pictured here is the same. It is attached to a Block L of the Molnyia rocket.

Venera 2MV-1 No.1, also known as Sputnik 19 in the West, was a Soviet spacecraft, which was launched in 1962 as part of the Venera programme. The spacecraft was based on the multi-purpose 2MV design, so that it could survive conditions on both Venus and Mars with only slight variations. It was the first of 3 2MV spacecraft destined to Venus, with 3 more destined to Mars.

Due to a problem with its upper stage it failed to leave low Earth orbit, and re-entered the atmosphere a few days later. It was the first of two Venera 2MV-1 spacecraft, both of which failed to leave Earth orbit.

== Background ==
During the last launch windows for Venus and Mars, the Soviet Union had launched 4 1MV probes, all of which failed before reaching their intended destination. A pair of 1VA probes were launched to Venus and a pair of 1M probes to Mars. With the failure of the first interplanetary probes, OKB-1, set out to create a better design that would survive the harsh conditions of space. OKB-1, the 'Experimental Design Bureau 1', had previously designed and launched Sputnik-1, the first artificial satellite, and Vostok 1, the first manned spaceflight.

However, with other projects like Vostok and Luna E-6, and with the Mars launch window occurring in October/November 1962 and the launch windows for Venus being just a month earlier in August/September 1962, there was not enough time to design a separate spacecraft. To finish the spacecraft in time, Sergei Korolev, head of OKB-1, commissioned the 2MV spacecraft, a multipurpose interplanetary spacecraft to be used by both the upcoming Venus and Mars missions, with only slight variations depending on the spacecraft's destination. The 2MV spacecraft were further split into:

=== Venus ===
- 2MV-1 No.1, this spacecraft
- 2MV-1 No.2, a Venus lander identical to this one
- 2MV-2, a Venus orbiter

=== Mars ===
- 2MV-3, a Mars lander
- 2MV-4 No.1, a Mars orbiter
- 2MV-4 No.2, also known as Mars 1, a Mars orbiter

== Design ==
Even though all three 2MV landers originated from the same design, the Venus and Mars versions had to be significantly different as the conditions on Venus were very different than the conditions on Mars. OKB-1 estimated that the atmosphere of Venus would be around 1.5 to 5 bars and 77°C while some other experts in the world astronomical community expected much higher pressures and temperatures as high as 324°C, much closer to the actual conditions. As a result of the difference in atmospheric conditions, the probe was more heavily built with a robust heat shield but a smaller and lighter parachute compared to its Martian counterpart. The last difference between the Venus and Mars probes was that the Venus versions were designed to float with a motion detector to detect wave action. This was because the conditions below the cloud layer of Venus were not known at the time and many believed that Venus could contain liquid oceans. The spacecraft was powered by 2.6m^{2} of solar cells that charged a 165.5 kilocoulomb nickel-cadmium battery at 1.3-2.6 Amps.

=== Descent capsule ===
The landing compartment was intended to detach shortly before its planetary encounter from the orbital compartment, which carried the landers. The landers were expected to burn up during atmospheric entry. The 90cm in diameter spherical descent capsule weighed 350kg and was sterilised before launch to prevent contaminating Venus as the possibility of life wasn't ruled out. It would be cooled using an ammonia-based cooling system. During its descent, the spacecraft would naturally orient itself retrograde, facing away from the direction of travel, so it could be protected by the heat shield, as the centre of mass was offset from their centre of figure. After entering the atmosphere a three-stage parachute system would slow down during descent. Starting in the summer of 1960, models of the lander were launched up to 50km in altitude with R-11A sounding rockets to test the design at high altitudes.

=== Launch Vehicle ===
The rocket used would be the 8K78 "Molniya" which had 1 successful launch out of 4 at that time. It had previously launched the probe pair Mars 1M in October 1960 and the Venus 1VA N.1 unsuccessfully with its only successful launch being the Venera 1 in February 1961. For the 2MV spacecraft, the 8K78 would get a number of improvements to increase its reliability as even though it was almost a 2 year old design, it was still the most powerful rocket in the world with 4 times the lifting capability of its American counterpart, the Atlas-Agena.

== Scientific instruments ==
Spacecraft bus:

- Magnetometer
- Scintillation counter
- Gas discharge Geiger counters
- Cherenkov detector
- Ion traps
- Cosmic wave detector
- Micrometeoroid detector

Lander:

- Chemical gas analyser
- Temperature sensors
- Density sensors
- Pressure sensors
- Gamma-ray counter
- Mercury level wave motion detector

== Launch ==
Venera 2MV-1 No.1 was launched at 02:18:45 UTC on 25 August 1962, atop a Molniya 8K78 carrier rocket flying from Site 1/5 at the Baikonur Cosmodrome. The first three stages of the rocket operated nominally, injecting the fourth stage and payload into a Low Earth Orbit. The fourth stage then coasted until 1 hour and 50 seconds after launch, when it fired its ullage motors in preparation for ignition. One of the four ullage motors failed to fire and, because of the asymmetric torque, the stage began to tumble out of control. Then, the main engine ignited for a four-minute burn to place the spacecraft into heliocentric orbit. Forty-five seconds later, its engine cut off from lack of fuel as it was sloshing around in the tank. This left the spacecraft stranded in Earth orbit for 3 days, until it re-entered the atmosphere 3 days later, on 28 August 1962.

== Spacecraft designation ==
The designations Sputnik 23, and later Sputnik 19 was used by the United States Naval Space Command to identify the spacecraft in its Satellite Situation Summary documents, since the Soviet Union did not release the internal designations of its spacecraft at that time, and had not assigned it an official name due to its failure to depart geocentric orbit.

== Aftermath ==
The first launch destined to Venus in the 1962 launch window was NASA's Mariner 1 that failed during launch on July 22, 1962. With this failure, the Soviets hoped that the 2MV-1 No.1 would succeed and be the first spacecraft to successful reach Venus. However after its failed launch on 25 August, NASA was the first to have a successful launch with Mariner 2 on 27 August. The Soviet 2MV-1 No.2 launched on 1 September and the 2MV-2 No.1 launched on 12 September, however, they both failed at launch. Mariner 2 would later become the first probe to conduct a successful flyby of Venus on 14 December 1962. By June 1963, OKB-1 had already started work on the next generation interplanetary probes, the 3MV.

== See also ==
- List of missions to Venus
