= List of spacecraft called Sputnik =

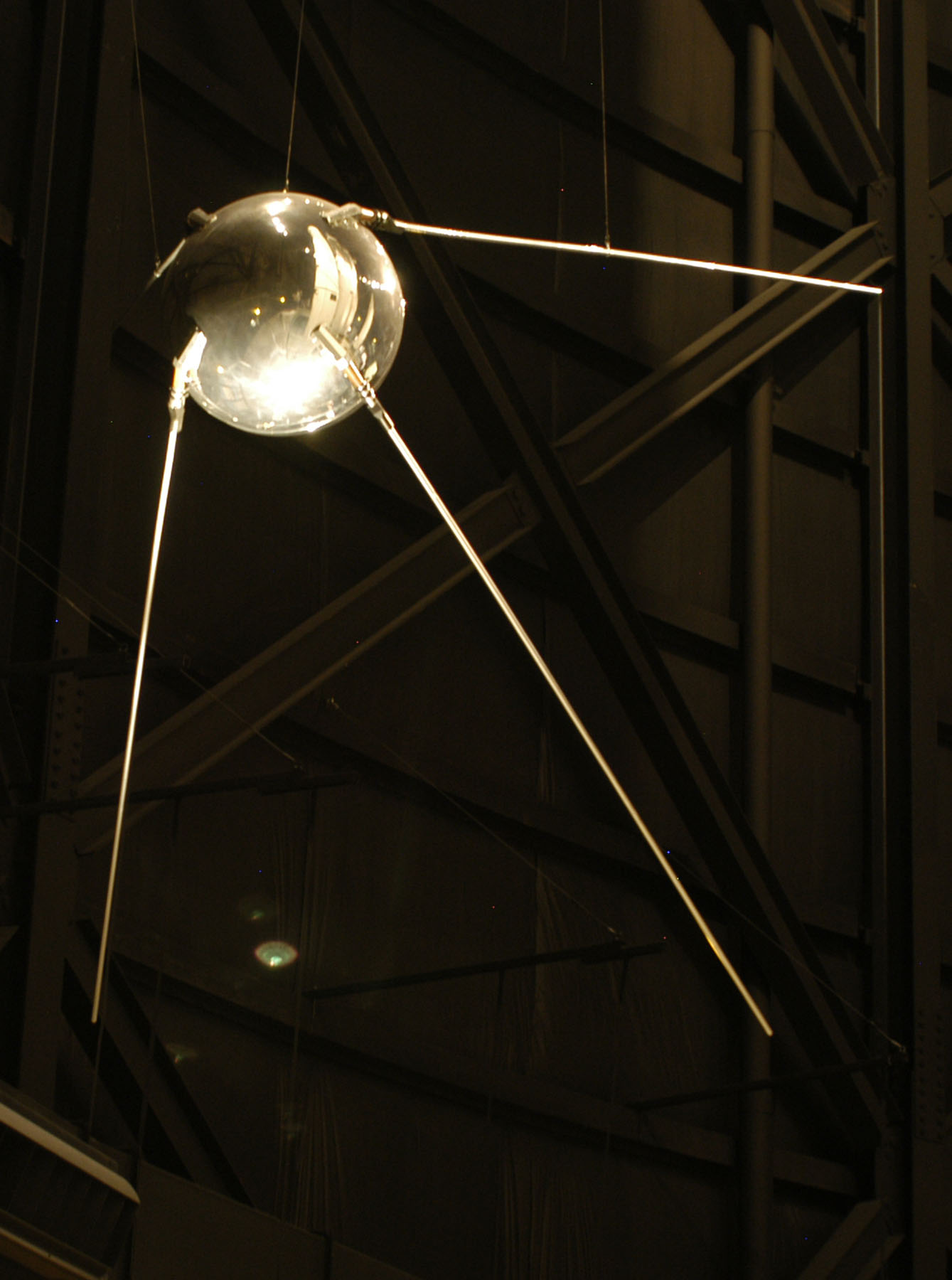
Sputnik 1

Sputnik (Спутник, Russian for "satellite") is a name for multiple spacecraft launched under the Soviet space program. "Sputnik 1", "Sputnik 2" and "Sputnik 3" were the official Soviet names of those objects, and the remaining designations in the series ("Sputnik 4" and so on) were not official names but names applied in the West to objects whose original Soviet names may not have been known at the time.

== Spacecraft officially named Sputnik ==
- Sputnik 1, the first artificial satellite to go into orbit, launched 4 October 1957
- Sputnik 2, the first spacecraft to carry a living animal (the dog Laika) into orbit, launched 3 November 1957
- Sputnik 3, a research satellite launched 15 May 1958

== Spacecraft with names containing Sputnik ==
Being the Russian term for "satellite", the word Sputnik has appeared in the names of other spacecraft:

- Dnepropetrovsk Sputnik, a series of scientific and technology development satellites
- Istrebitel Sputnikov, "Destroyer of Satellites", a series of antisatellite weapons and targets
- Tyazhely Sputnik, "Heavy Satellite", a failed Venus probe
- Upravlyaemy Sputnik, "Controllable Satellite", a series of ocean surveillance and missile detection satellites
  - US-A, nuclear-powered ocean radar surveillance satellites
  - US-K, molniya orbit missile detection satellites
  - US-KS, geosynchronous orbit missile detection satellites
  - US-KMO, Modernised geosynchronous orbit missile detection satellites
  - US-P, electronic ocean surveillance satellites
  - US-PM, modernised electronic ocean surveillance satellites

== Spacecraft designated "Sputnik" in the West ==
These objects are listed with their official Soviet names:

- Sputnik 4 – Korabl-Sputnik 1
- Sputnik 5 – Korabl-Sputnik 2
- Sputnik 6 – Korabl-Sputnik 3
- Sputnik 7 – Tyazhely Sputnik
- Sputnik 8 – Venera 1
- Sputnik 9 – Korabl-Sputnik 4
- Sputnik 10 – Korabl-Sputnik 5
- Sputnik 11 – Kosmos 1
- Sputnik 12 – Kosmos 2
- Sputnik 13 – Kosmos 3
- Sputnik 14 – Kosmos 4
- Sputnik 15 – Kosmos 5
- Sputnik 16 – Kosmos 6
- Sputnik 17 – Kosmos 7
- Sputnik 18 – Kosmos 8
- Sputnik 19 – Venera 2MV-1 No.1
- Sputnik 20 – Venera 2MV-1 No.2
- Sputnik 21 – Venera 2MV-2 No.1
- Sputnik 22 – Mars 2MV-4 No.1
- Sputnik 23 – Mars 1
- Sputnik 24 – Mars 2MV-3 No.1
- Sputnik 25 – Luna E-6 No.2

== Spacecraft named after Sputnik 1 ==
- Sputnik 40
- Sputnik 41
- Sputnik 99

== See also ==
- Lists of spacecraft
