= Timeline of space exploration =

This is a timeline of space exploration which includes notable missions, achievements, first accomplishments and milestones in humanity's exploration of outer space.

This timeline generally does not distinguish achievements by a specific country or private company, as it considers humanity as a whole. See otherwise the timeline of private spaceflight or look for achievements by each space agency.

== Pre-20th century ==
Date	Event leading to space exploration	Country	Researcher(s)	Ref(s).
1610	First telescopic observation of the night sky: discovery of the Galilean moons, lunar craters and the phases of Venus.	Venice	Galileo Galilei	
1668	First reflecting telescope.	England	Isaac Newton	
1781	First telescopic discovery of planet (Uranus).	Great Britain	William Herschel	
1801	First discovery of asteroid (Ceres).	Sicily	Giuseppe Piazzi	
1813	First exposition of the rocket equation based on Newton's third law of motion: Treatise on the Motion of Rockets.	UK	William Moore	
1840	First clear telescopic photograph of another world: the Moon.	United States	John William Draper	
1845	First proper observation of other galaxies which are termed "whirlpool nebulae".	UK	William Parsons	
1861	A Journey Through Space makes first proposal of using rockets for space flight.	UK	William Leitch	
1895	First proposal of space elevator.	Russia	Konstantin Tsiolkovsky	

== 1900–1956 ==
Date	Mission success	Country	Researcher(s) or Mission name	Ref(s).
1903	Publication of Exploration of the Universe with Rocket-Propelled Vehicles that showed physical space exploration was theoretically possible, including the Tsiolkovsky rocket equation, multi staged rockets and using liquid oxygen and liquid hydrogen in liquid propellant	Russia	Konstantin Tsiolkovsky	
1914	Goddard files for and is subsequently awarded U.S. patents on multistage and liquid-fueled rockets.	United States	Robert H. Goddard	
1917	First observation of an extrasolar planet (exoplanet) round Van Maanen 2 although it is not recognised as such at the time.	Netherlands	Adriaan van Maanen	
1919	Goddard's widely influential paper "A Method of Reaching Extreme Altitudes" discussed solid- and liquid-fueled rocketry.	United States	Robert H. Goddard	
15 December 1923	Die Rakete zu den Planetenräumen ("By Rocket into Planetary Space") self-published after its rejection as a doctoral thesis.	Germany	Hermann Oberth	
1924	Society for Studies of Interplanetary Travel founded.	USSR	Members include Konstantin Tsiolkovsky, Friedrich Zander, Yuri Kondratyuk	
16 March 1926	Goddard launches the first liquid-fueled rocket.	United States	Robert H. Goddard	
1927	Verein für Raumschiffahrt (Society for Space Travel) formed; it includes many top European rocket scientists.	Germany		
1927	Завоевание межпланетных пространств (The Conquest of Interplanetary Space) discusses rocket mechanics and orbital effects including the gravitational slingshot.	USSR	Yuri Kondratyuk	
1928	Das Problem der Befahrung des Weltraums – der Raketen-Motor (The Problem of Space Travel – The Rocket Motor) discusses space travel and its potential uses for scientific experiments.	Germany	Herman Potočnik	
January 1933	British Interplanetary Society founded.	UK	Philip E. Cleator	
April 1933	First detection of radio waves from an astronomical object.	United States	Karl Jansky	
September 1933	Establishment of the Soviet rocket research lab Reactive Scientific Research Institute (RNII) by combining the Group for the Study of Reactive Motion (GIRD) with the Gas Dynamics Laboratory (GDL).	USSR	Key people Sergei Korolev & Valentin Glushko	
20 June 1944	First spaceflight in history. First human-made object in space (later defined as above the Kármán line).	Germany (Wehrmacht)	V-2 rocket (MW 18014)	
October 1945	Article in Wireless World, "Extra-Terrestrial Relays — Can Rocket Stations Give Worldwide Radio Coverage?" makes first discussion of geostationary satellites as a means of communication.	UK	Arthur C. Clarke	
10 May 1946	First space research flight (cosmic radiation experiments).	United States	captured and improved V-2 rocket	
24 October 1946	First pictures of Earth from 105 km (65 mi).	United States	V-2	
20 February 1947	Fruit flies become the first animals in space to survive a space flight.	United States	V-2	
24 February 1949	First two-stage liquid-fueled rocket, that sets a record altitude of 244 miles (393 km) (WAC Corporal missile mounted onto a V-2 rocket).	United States	Bumper-5	
14 June 1949	First mammal in space (Albert II, a rhesus monkey). First primate in space.	United States	V-2	
22 July 1951	First mammal to survive a space flight. (Dezik and Tsygan).	USSR	Soviet space dogs	
5 October 1954	The composite image taken from specially modified cameras on board an Aerobee sounding rocket produces the first color picture of Earth and the first detailed view of a tropical cyclone.	United States	Dr. Otto Berg's films	
20 September 1956	First rocket to pass the thermopause and enter the exosphere. At 682 miles (1,098 km) altitude and 3,335 miles range, the 3-stage Jupiter-C breaks both records and achieves Mach 18 velocity.	United States	Jupiter-C	

== 1957–1959 ==
Date	Mission achievements	Country/organization	Mission name	Ref(s).
4 October 1957	First artificial satellite. First human-made signals from space.	USSR	Sputnik 1	
3 November 1957	First mammal in orbit, the dog Laika.	USSR	Sputnik 2	
31 January 1958	Confirmed existence of the Van Allen radiation belt.	USA (ABMA)	Explorer 1	
17 March 1958	First use of solar power in space. The oldest artificial object still in space.	USA (NRL)	Vanguard 1	
4 January 1959	First rocket to reach Earth escape velocity. First spacecraft to attempt to impact the Moon's surface. First artificial object in heliocentric orbit. First detection of solar wind.	USSR	Luna 1	
17 February 1959	First weather satellite.	USA (NRL)	Vanguard 2	
7 August 1959	First photograph of Earth from Earth orbit.	USA (NASA)	Explorer 6	
13 September 1959	First spacecraft to impact another celestial body (the Moon). First delivery of national pennants to a celestial body.	USSR	Luna 2	
4 October 1959	First photos of another world from space: the far side of the Moon. First gravity assist.	USSR	Luna 3	

== 1960–1969 ==
Date	Mission success	Country/organization	Mission name	Ref(s).
March 1960	First solar probe.	USA (NASA)	Pioneer 5	
19 August 1960	First plants and animals to return alive from Earth orbit.	USSR	Sputnik 5	
25 September 1960	First rocket engine fired in space.	USA (NASA)	Pioneer P-30	
31 January 1961	First hominidae in space (chimpanzee Ham). First tasks performed in space.	USA (NASA)	M-R 2	
12 February 1961	First launch from Earth orbit of upper stage into a heliocentric orbit. First mid-course corrections. First spin-stabilisation.	USSR	Venera 1	
12 April 1961	First human spaceflight (Yuri Gagarin). First human-crewed orbital flight.	USSR	Vostok 1	
5 May 1961	First human-piloted space flight (Alan Shepard). First human-crewed suborbital flight.	USA	Freedom 7	
19 May 1961	First planetary flyby (within 100,000 km of Venus – no data returned).	USSR	Venera 1	
6 August 1961	First crewed space flight lasting over twenty four hours by Gherman Titov, who is also the first to suffer from space sickness.	USSR	Vostok 2	
7 March 1962	First orbital solar observatory.	USA (NASA)	OSO-1	
26 April 1962	First spacecraft to impact the far side of the Moon.	USA (NASA)	Ranger 4	
11 August 1962	First dual crewed spaceflight. First communication between two crewed space vehicles in orbit. First person to float freely in microgravity.	USSR	Vostok 3 and Vostok 4	
18 August 1962	First auroral research rocket launched into the ionosphere.	Norway	Ferdinand 1	
November 1962	First Mars flyby (11,000 km) but contact was lost.	USSR	Mars 1	
14 December 1962	First planetary flyby with data returned (Venus). First successful planetary science mission.	USA (NASA)	Mariner 2	
16 June 1963	First woman in space (Valentina Tereshkova).	USSR	Vostok 6	
19 July 1963	First reusable crewed spacecraft (suborbital).	USA (NASA)	X-15 Flight 90	
12 October 1964	First multi-person crew (3) in orbit.	USSR	Voskhod 1	
18 March 1965	First space walk/extra-vehicular activity (Alexei Leonov).	USSR	Voskhod 2	
March 1965	First crewed spacecraft to change orbit.	USA (NASA)	Gemini 3	
14 July 1965	First flyby of Mars (returned pictures).	USA (NASA)	Mariner 4	
14 July 1965	First photographs of another planet from deep space (Mars).	USA (NASA)	Mariner 4	
15 December 1965	First orbital rendezvous (parallel flight, no docking).	USA (NASA)	Gemini 6A/Gemini 7	
3 February 1966	First soft landing on another world (the Moon). First photos from another world. First use of a landing airbag to land on another world.	USSR	Luna 9	
1 March 1966	First impact into another planet (Venus).	USSR	Venera 3	
16 March 1966	First orbital docking between two spacecraft.	USA (NASA)	Gemini 8/Agena target vehicle	
3 April 1966	First artificial satellite around another world (the Moon).	USSR	Luna 10	
23 August 1966	First picture of Earth from another astronomical object (the Moon). First probe to map the Moon.	USA	Lunar Orbiter 1	
8 May 1967	First polar orbit around the Moon.	USA	Lunar Orbiter 4	
July 1967	First photos of the Lunar south pole.	USA	Lunar Orbiter 4	
30 October 1967	First automated (crewless) docking.	USSR	Cosmos 186/Cosmos 188	
17 November 1967	First liftoff from another celestial body (the Moon).	USA	Surveyor 6	
September 1968	First animals and plants to leave Earth orbit and travel to and around the Moon. First lunar spacecraft to be recovered successfully.	USSR	Zond 5	
7 December 1968	First orbital ultraviolet observatory.	USA (NASA)	OAO-2	
21 December 1968	First human excursion beyond low Earth orbit. First in-person observations of Earth from a distance. First Trans-Earth injection.	USA (NASA)	Apollo 8	
24 December 1968	First human flight to another celestial body (the Moon) and to enter its gravitational influence.	USA (NASA)	Apollo 8	
January 1969	First docking between two crewed spacecraft in Earth orbit. First crew exchange in space.	USSR	Soyuz 4 and Soyuz 5	
January 1969	First spacecraft to parachute in Venus's atmosphere, lost contact before landing.	USSR	Venera 5	
23 May 1969	First docking of two crewed spacecraft around another celestial body. First lunar mission to include a lunar landing module.	USA (NASA)	Apollo 10	
20 July 1969	First human on another celestial body (the Moon). First words spoken from another world.	USA (NASA)	Apollo 11	
21 July 1969	First space launch from another celestial body. First sample return from another celestial body.	USA (NASA)	Apollo 11	
19 November 1969	First rendezvous on the surface of a celestial body. First meet up between human explorers and a robotic spacecraft in space (on the Moon).	USA (NASA)	Apollo 12/Surveyor 3	

== 1970–1979 ==
Date	Mission success	Country/organization	Mission name	Ref(s).
14 April 1970	Farthest distance from Earth traveled by humans until the Artemis II lunar flyby in 2026.	USA (NASA)	Apollo 13	(Note: The record was set because the Moon was nearly at its furthest from Earth during the mission. Apollo 13's unique free return trajectory caused it to go approximately 100 kilometers (60 mi) further from the lunar far side than other Apollo lunar missions, but this was a minor contribution to the record. A reconstruction of the trajectory by astrodynamicist Daniel Adamo in 2009 records the furthest distance as 400,046 kilometers (248,577 mi) at 7:34 pm EST (00:34:13 UTC). Apollo 10 holds the record for second-furthest at a distance of 399,806 kilometers (248,428 mi).)
24 September 1970	First automatic sample return from the Moon.	USSR	Luna 16	
17 November 1970	First rover on another celestial body (the Moon). First lunar rover.	USSR	Lunokhod 1	
12 December 1970	First X-ray orbital observatory.	USA (NASA)	Uhuru	
15 December 1970	First soft landing on another planet (Venus). First signals from another planet.	USSR	Venera 7	
19 April 1971	First space station.	USSR	Salyut 1	
June 1971	First crewed orbital observatory.	USSR	Orion 1	
30 July 1971	First motor vehicle on another celestial body (Lunar Roving Vehicle).	USA (NASA)	Apollo 15	
14 November 1971	First spacecraft to orbit another planet (Mars).	USA (NASA)	Mariner 9	
27 November 1971	First spacecraft to impact another planet (Mars).	USSR	Mars 2	
2 December 1971	First soft landing on Mars. First signals from Martian surface. First photograph from Martian surface.	USSR	Mars 3	
3 March 1972	First spacecraft on a trajectory out of the Solar System. First spacecraft to use all-nuclear electrical power (SNAP-19 RTGs).	USA (NASA)	Pioneer 10	
15 July 1972	First spacecraft to enter the asteroid belt. First spacecraft beyond the orbit of Mars.	USA (NASA)	Pioneer 10	
15 November 1972	First orbital gamma ray observatory.	USA (NASA)	SAS 2	
11 December 1972	Most recent crewed landing on the Moon.	USA (NASA)	Apollo 17	
3 November 1973	First mission sent to study Mercury.	USA (NASA)	Mariner 10	
3 December 1973	First flyby of Jupiter. First spacecraft beyond the Inner Solar System.	USA (NASA)	Pioneer 10	
January 1974	First spacecraft to return data on a long-period comet.	USA (NASA)	Mariner 10	
5 February 1974	First mission to explore two planets in a single mission (Mercury and Venus). First photograph of Venus from space. First use of solar wind for spacecraft orientation.	USA (NASA)	Mariner 10	
29 March 1974	First flyby of Mercury.	USA (NASA)	Mariner 10	
21 Sep 1974	First spacecraft to flyby the same planet multiple times (Mercury).	USA (NASA)	Mariner 10	
15 July 1975	First multinational crewed mission.	USSR USA (NASA)	Apollo-Soyuz Test Project	
20 October 1975	First spacecraft to orbit Venus.	USSR	Venera 9	
22 October 1975	First successful photos from the surface of another planet (Venus).	USSR	Venera 9	
20 July 1976	First successful photos and soil samples from the surface of Mars.	USA (NASA)	Viking Lander	
26 January 1978	First real time remotely operated ultraviolet orbital observatory.	USA (NASA); ESA; UK (SERC)	International Ultraviolet Explorer	
20 November 1978	First spacecraft to orbit the Sun at Lagrange 1.	USA (NASA)	ISEE-3/ICE	
4 December 1978	First extended (multi-year) orbital exploration of Venus (from 1978 to 1992).	USA (NASA)	Pioneer Venus Orbiter	
5 March 1979	Jupiter flyby (closest approach 349,000 km); Encounters with five Jovian moons. Discovery of volcanism on Io.	USA (NASA)	Voyager 1	
1 September 1979	First flyby of Saturn. First photograph of Titan from deep space.	USA (NASA)	Pioneer 11	

== 1980–1989 ==
Date	Mission success	Country/organization	Mission name	Ref(s).
12 November 1980	Saturn flyby (closest approach 124,000 km), close encounter of Titan and encounters with a dozen other moons.	USA (NASA)	Voyager 1	
12 April 1981	First reusable crewed orbital spacecraft (Space Shuttle).	USA (NASA)	STS-1	
1 March 1982	First Venus soil samples First sound recording of another world (Venus).	USSR	Venera 13	
10 June 1982	First spacecraft to conduct a deep survey of Earth's magnetic tail.	USA (NASA)	ISEE-3/ICE	
19 August 1982	First mixed gender crew aboard space station, and first woman, Svetlana Savitskaya, on space station.	USSR	Salyut 7	
1982	First plants grown in space (Arabidopsis).	USSR	Salyut 7	
25 January 1983	First Infrared orbital observatory.	USA (NASA); UK (SERC); Netherlands (NIVR)	IRAS	
13 June 1983	First spacecraft beyond the orbit of Neptune. First spacecraft beyond all Solar System planets.	USA (NASA)	Pioneer 10	
7 February 1984	First untethered spacewalk (Bruce McCandless II).	USA (NASA)	STS-41-B	
25 July 1984	First spacewalk by a woman (Svetlana Savitskaya).	USSR	Salyut 7	
11 June 1985	First balloon deployed on another planet (Venus).	USSR	Vega 1	
11 September 1985	First spacecraft to flyby a comet (21P/Giacobini-Zinner). (Note: Soviet spacecraft Vega 1 and Vega 2 and ESA spacecraft Giotto all made a flyby of Halley's Comet the year after, in 1986.)	USA (NASA)	ISEE-3/ICE	
24 January 1986	First spacecraft to flyby Uranus.	USA (NASA)	Voyager 2	
19 February 1986	First consistently inhabited long-term research space station.	USSR	Mir	
13 March 1986	First close up observations of a comet (Halley's Comet, 596 kilometers).	ESA	Giotto	
July 1988	First suspected detection of an exoplanet (Gamma Cephei Ab). (Note: Although the discovery was retracted in 1994, and not confirmed until 2002.)	Canada	Astronomers Bruce Campbell, Gordon Walker and Stephenson Yang.	
8 August 1989	First astrometric satellite.	ESA	Hipparcos	
25 August 1989	First spacecraft to flyby Neptune. First spacecraft to study all four of the Solar System's giant planets at close range.	USA (NASA)	Voyager 2	
18 November 1989	First orbital cosmic microwave observatory.	USA (NASA)	COBE	

== 1990–1999 ==
Date	Mission success	Country/organization	Mission name	Ref(s).
14 February 1990	First photograph of the whole Solar System (Family Portrait).	USA (NASA)	Voyager 1	
24 April 1990	First telescope designed to be repaired in space.	USA (NASA); ESA	Hubble Space Telescope	
2 July 1990	First time a spacecraft coming from deep space uses the Earth for a gravity-assist manoeuvre.	ESA	Giotto	
21 October 1991	First asteroid flyby (951 Gaspra closest approach 1,600 km).	USA (NASA)	Galileo	
1992	First confirmed observation of an exoplanet.	Canada; Poland	Aleksander Wolszczan & Dale Frail	
8 February 1992	First polar orbit around the Sun. First mission to survey the space environment above and below the poles of the Sun.	USA (NASA); ESA	Ulysses	
13 September 1992	First spacecraft to map Venus in its entirety.	USA (NASA)	Magellan	
22 March 1995	Record longest duration spaceflight to date (437.7 day by Valeri Polyakov).	Russia (FKA)	Mir	
July 1995	Identification and confirmation of the first exoplanet orbiting a main-sequence star.	Switzerland	Michel Mayor, Didier Queloz	
7 December 1995	First orbit of Jupiter.	USA (NASA)	Galileo	
7 December 1995	First spacecraft to enter the atmosphere of a gas giant (Jupiter).	USA (NASA)	Galileo's atmospheric entry probe	
1995	First laser communication from space.	Japan (NASDA, NICT)	ETS-VI	
12 February 1997	First orbital radio observatory.	Japan (ISAS)	HALCA	
4 July 1997	First operational rover on another planet (Mars).	USA (NASA)	Mars Pathfinder / Sojourner	
17 September 1997	First spacecraft to use aerobraking to enter orbit (Martian orbit).	USA (NASA)	Mars Global Surveyor	
20 November 1998	First multinational space station. Largest artificial object built in space to date.	Russia (FKA); USA (NASA); Europe (ESA); Japan (JAXA); Canada (CSA)	International Space Station	

== 2000–2009 ==
Date	Mission success	Country/organization	Mission name	Ref(s).
14 February 2000	First orbit of an asteroid (433 Eros).	USA (NASA) ESA	NEAR Shoemaker	
2 November 2000	Beginning of an uninterrupted human presence in space.	Russia (FKA); USA (NASA); Kazakhstan	Expedition 1	
12 February 2001	First landing on an asteroid (433 Eros).	USA (NASA)	NEAR Shoemaker	
November 2001	First laser communication in space between two objects.	ESA France (CNES)	Artemis, SPOT 4	
17 May 2004	First amateur spaceflight.	USA (CSXT)	CSXT GoFast	
1 July 2004	First orbit of Saturn.	USA (NASA) ESA Italy (ASI)	Cassini–Huygens	
8 September 2004	First sample return beyond lunar orbit (solar wind).	USA (NASA)	Genesis	
14 January 2005	First landing in the outer Solar System (Titan). First landing on a moon other than Earth's Moon.	ESA USA (NASA) Italy (ASI)	Cassini–Huygens	
January–February 2005	First confirmed cryovolcano (Enceladus).	ESA USA (NASA) Italy (ASI)	Cassini–Huygens	
4 July 2005	First spacecraft to impact a comet (Tempel 1).	USA (NASA)	Deep Impact	
19 November 2005	First asteroid ascent (25143 Itokawa). First interplanetary escape without separating and discarding the landing gear.	Japan (JAXA)	Hayabusa	
15 January 2006	First sample return from a comet (81P/Wild).	USA (NASA)	Stardust	
3 January 2007	First confirmed lakes on the surface of another celestial body (lakes of Titan).	USA (NASA) ESA Italy (ASI)	Cassini–Huygens	
25 May 2008	First spacecraft to photograph another spacecraft landing on another celestial body (Phoenix, on Mars).	USA (NASA)	Mars Reconnaissance Orbiter	
8 November 2008	First discovery of lunar water in the form of ice. (Note: On December 3, 1996 (prior to 2008), the US Department of Defense announced that Clementine data suggested evidence of ice at the lunar south pole. However, the discovery was not confirmed and Clementine data might have been misinterpreted.)	India (ISRO)	Chandrayaan-1	
6 March 2009	First space telescope designated to search for Earth-like exoplanets.	USA (NASA)	Kepler Mission	
August 2009	First images of the structures in the rings of a planet (rings of Saturn).	USA (NASA) ESA Italy (ASI)	Cassini–Huygens	

== 2010–2019 ==
Date	Mission success	Country/organization	Mission name	Ref(s).
20 May 2010	First solar sail.	Japan (JAXA)	IKAROS	
13 June 2010	First sample return from an asteroid (25143 Itokawa).	Japan (JAXA)	Hayabusa	
25 August 2010	First spacecraft to orbit one of the Moon's Lagrange point (L2).	USA (NASA)	ARTEMIS-P1	
22 October 2010	First spacecraft to orbit the Moon's Lagrange 1 point.	USA (NASA)	ARTEMIS-P2	
18 March 2011	First orbit of Mercury.	USA (NASA)	MESSENGER	
16 July 2011	First orbit of an object in the asteroid belt (4 Vesta).	USA (NASA)	Dawn	
6 August 2012	First use of a sky crane to land on another celestial body (Mars).	USA (NASA)	Mars Science Laboratory	
25 August 2012	First spacecraft to leave the heliosphere. First spacecraft in interstellar space.	USA (NASA)	Voyager 1	
January 2013	First laser communication with a lunar satellite.	USA (NASA)	Lunar Reconnaissance Orbiter	
10 September 2014	First spacecraft to orbit a comet nucleus (67P/Churyumov–Gerasimenko).	ESA	Rosetta	
12 November 2014	First soft landing on a comet (67P/Churyumov–Gerasimenko).	ESA	Philae	
6 March 2015	First flyby and orbit of a dwarf planet (Ceres). First spacecraft to orbit two separate celestial bodies.	USA (NASA)	Dawn	
July 2015	First flyby of an object beyond Neptune (Pluto and its moons). First flyby in the Kuiper belt. First flyby of a trans-neptunian object. Last original encounter with one of the nine major planets recognized before 2006.	USA (NASA)	New Horizons	
10 August 2015	First food grown in space eaten (lettuce).	USA (NASA) Japan (JAXA)	International Space Station	
14 September 2015	First observation of gravitational waves.	LSC – EGO	LIGO – Virgo	
23 November 2015	First propulsive landing of a rocket after sending something into space (suborbital).	USA (Blue Origin)	New Shepard 2	
21 December 2015	First propulsive landing of an orbital rocket.	USA (SpaceX)	Falcon 9 flight 20	
16 April 2016	First inflatable space habitat. (Note: The reason why it is BEAM (2016) rather than Genesis I (2006) is that BEAM was specifically designed for human habitation and was attached to the ISS, while Genesis I and Genesis II (2007) were technology demonstration prototypes for future space habitats.)	USA (Bigelow Aerospace)	BEAM	
15 September 2017	First spacecraft to enter the atmosphere of Saturn.	USA (NASA) ESA Italy (ASI)	Cassini–Huygens	
19 October 2017	First known interstellar object detected passing through the Solar System.	USA (Haleakalā Observatory)	Oumuamua	
21 September 2018	First operational rover on an asteroid (162173 Ryugu).	Japan (JAXA)	Hayabusa2	
1 December 2018	First recorded sounds from Mars.	USA (NASA)	InSight	
1 January 2019	First flyby of a classical Kuiper belt object (486958 Arrokoth). First flyby of a contact binary. First spacecraft to make two different flybys in the Kuiper belt. Furthest object ever explored by a spacecraft.	USA (NASA)	New Horizons	
3 January 2019	First soft landing on the far side of the Moon. First germination of seeds on another celestial body.	China (CNSA)	Chang'e 4	
10 April 2019	First direct photograph of a black hole and its vicinity.	USA (NASA)	Event Horizon Telescope	

== Since 2020 ==
Date	Mission success	Country/organization	Mission name	Ref(s).
6 April 2021	First confirmed quake on another planet (marsquake).	USA (NASA)	InSight	
19 April 2021	First aerodynamically powered flight on another celestial body (Mars).	USA (NASA)	Ingenuity	
20 April 2021	First in situ resource utilization. First production of oxygen on another celestial body (Mars).	USA (NASA)	MOXIE	
14 December 2021	First spacecraft to fly through the atmosphere of a star (the Sun's corona).	USA (NASA)	Parker Solar Probe	
25 December 2021	Launch of the largest optical space telescope to date.	USA (NASA) ESA Canada (CSA)	James Webb Space Telescope	
26 September 2022	First spacecraft to measurably deflect an asteroid. First spacecraft to make contact with an asteroid moon (impact on Dimorphos).	USA (NASA)	DART	
23 August 2023	First landing at the lunar south polar region.	India (ISRO)	Chandrayaan-3	
14 March 2024	First successful demonstration of in space propellant transfer.	USA (SpaceX)	Starship flight test 3	
6 June 2024	First successful instance of both stages of a launch vehicle doing a controlled return to the surface.	USA (SpaceX)	Starship flight test 4	
25 June 2024	First samples returned from the far side of the Moon.	China (CNSA)	Chang'e 6	
13 October 2024	First catch of a rocket booster.	USA (SpaceX)	Starship flight test 5	
1 April 2025	First crewed spaceflight to enter a Polar orbit around Earth.	USA (SpaceX)	Fram2	
1 April 2026	First crewed spaceflight beyond low Earth orbit since 1972.	USA (NASA)	Artemis II	
6 April 2026	Farthest distance traveled by humans.	USA (NASA)	Artemis II	
14 November 2026	First catch of the second stage of a rocket.	USA (SpaceX)	Starship flight 15	

== See also ==
- Discovery and exploration of the Solar System
- List of spaceflight records
  - List of spaceflight records#Human spaceflight firsts
- Timeline of Solar System exploration – A comprehensive list of events in the exploration of the Solar System.
- Timeline of artificial satellites and space probes – A comprehensive list of artificial satellites and space probes.
- Timeline of space travel by nationality
- Timeline of spaceflight – Chronological list of events in spaceflight broken down as a separate article for each year
- Timeline of private spaceflight – For first achievements by private space companies
