= Mars 2MV-4 No.1 =

Soviet space mission

2MV-4 No.1
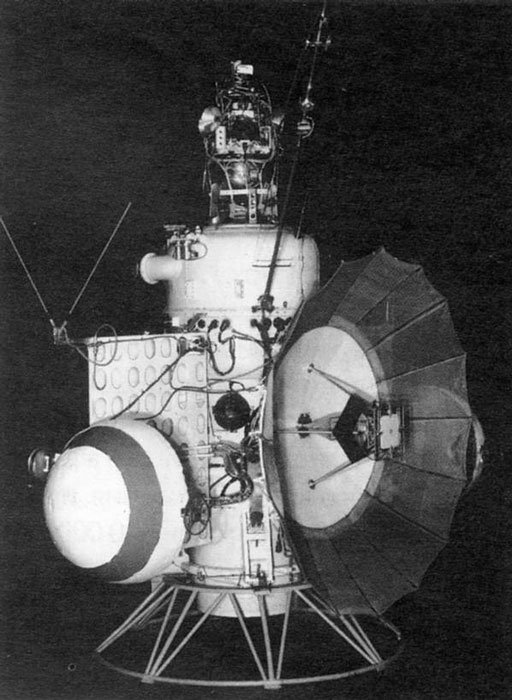
- Mission type: Mars flyby
- Operator: Soviet Union
- COSPAR ID: 1962-057A
- SATCAT no.: 443
- Mission duration: 5 days

Spacecraft properties
- Spacecraft type: 2MV-4
- Manufacturer: OKB-1
- Launch mass: 893.5 kilograms (1,970 lb)

Start of mission
- Launch date: 24 October 1962, 17:55:05 UTC
- Rocket: Molniya 8K78 s/n T103-15
- Launch site: Baikonur 1/5

End of mission
- Decay date: 29 October 1962 – 26 February 1963

Orbital parameters
- Reference system: Geocentric
- Regime: Low Earth (achieved); Heliocentric (intended)

Mars 2MV-4 No.1 also known as Sputnik 22 in the West, was a Soviet spacecraft, which was launched in 1962 as part of the Mars programme, and was intended to make a flyby of Mars, and transmit images of the planet back to Earth. Due to a problem with the rocket which launched it, it was destroyed in low Earth orbit. It was the first of two Mars 2MV-4 spacecraft to be launched, the other being the Mars 1 spacecraft which was launched eight days later.

== Launch ==
With the Cuban Missile Crisis unfolding, the USSR spacecraft Mars 2MV-4 No.1 was launched at 17:55:04 UTC on 24 October 1962, atop a Molniya 8K78 carrier rocket flying from Site 1/5 at the Baikonur Cosmodrome. The lower stages of the rocket performed nominally, placing the payload and the Blok L upper stage into low Earth orbit. When the Blok L ignited following a coast phase, lubricant leaked out of the turbopump, which consequently seized up and disintegrated. This caused the main engine to explode, destroying the upper stage and spacecraft. Twenty two pieces of debris from the spacecraft and upper stage were catalogued, which decayed between 29 October 1962 and 26 February 1963.

== Designations ==
The designations Sputnik 29, and later Sputnik 22, were used by the United States Naval Space Command to identify the spacecraft in its Satellite Situation Summary documents, since the Soviet Union did not release the internal designations of its spacecraft at that time, and had not assigned it an official name due to its failure to depart geocentric orbit. A United States Ballistic Missile Early Warning System station in Alaska detected the debris from the launch, and initially identified it as incoming nuclear warheads, since the launch had occurred during the Cuban Missile Crisis.

== Scientific Instruments ==
The spacecraft carried two instruments on board:

- Imaging System
- Magnetometer

== See also ==
- List of missions to Mars
- List of Mars Landers
- List of artificial object on Mars
- List of Venus Missions
