= 2MV =

Soviet uncrewed Venus and Mars probe design

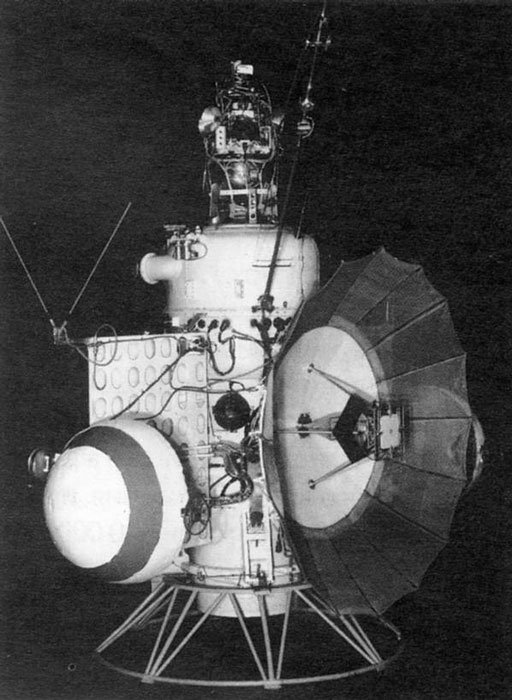
- Manufacturer: OKB-1
- Country of origin: Soviet Union
- Operator: Soviet Space Program

The 2MV planetary probe (short for 2nd generation Mars-Venus) is a designation for a common design used by early Soviet uncrewed probes to Mars and Venus.

It was an incremental improvement of earlier 1MV probes and was used for the Venera 5 and Venera 6 missions to Venus. It was standard practice of the Soviet space program to use standardized components as much as possible.

All probes shared the same general characteristics and differed only in equipment necessary for specific missions. Each probe also incorporated improvements based on experience with earlier missions.

It was superseded by the 3MV family.

== Background ==
After the 1MV missions, where 3 out of the four had launch failures, OKB-1, led by Sergei Korolev, set out to make an improved spacecraft for the upcoming Venus and Mars launch windows in 1962. On July 30th, the 2MV spacecraft design was officially approved for development by OKB-1. While there was only one major spacecraft design, slight variations would be made for the Venus and Mars orbiters and landers as the conditions each spacecraft had to experience were very different.

== Design ==
The probe consisted of three primary parts.

=== Orbital Compartment ===
The core of the stack was a pressurized compartment called the Orbital Compartment measuring 2.1 meters with a diameter of 1.1 meters pressurized to 1.1 bar using dry nitrogen. This greatly increased the launch weight but simplified cooling. Also mounted on the Orbital Compartment was a parabolic high-gain antenna, used for long-range communications.

=== Payloads ===
Depending on the mission, the probe would carry specific instruments or a detachable landing module.

=== Engine ===
Course correction capabilities were provided by a KDU-414 engine attached to the top of the Orbital Compartment. Near the engines was also the attitude control system which used pressurized nitrogen.

== Variants ==
- 2MV-1: Venera 2MV-1 No.1 (Sputnik 19), Venera 2MV-1 No.2 (Sputnik 20)
- 2MV-2: Venera 2MV-2 No.1 (Sputnik 21)
- 2MV-4: Mars 2MV-4 No.1 (Sputnik 22), Mars 1 (Mars 2MV-4 or Sputnik 23)
- 2MV-3: Mars 2MV-3 No.1 (Sputnik 24)
- 2V (V-69): Venera 5 (2V (V-69) No.330), Venera 6 (2V (V-69) No.331)

== See also ==
- Soviet space program
- Venera program
- 1MV
