= Venera 6 =

1969 Soviet robotic lander on Venus

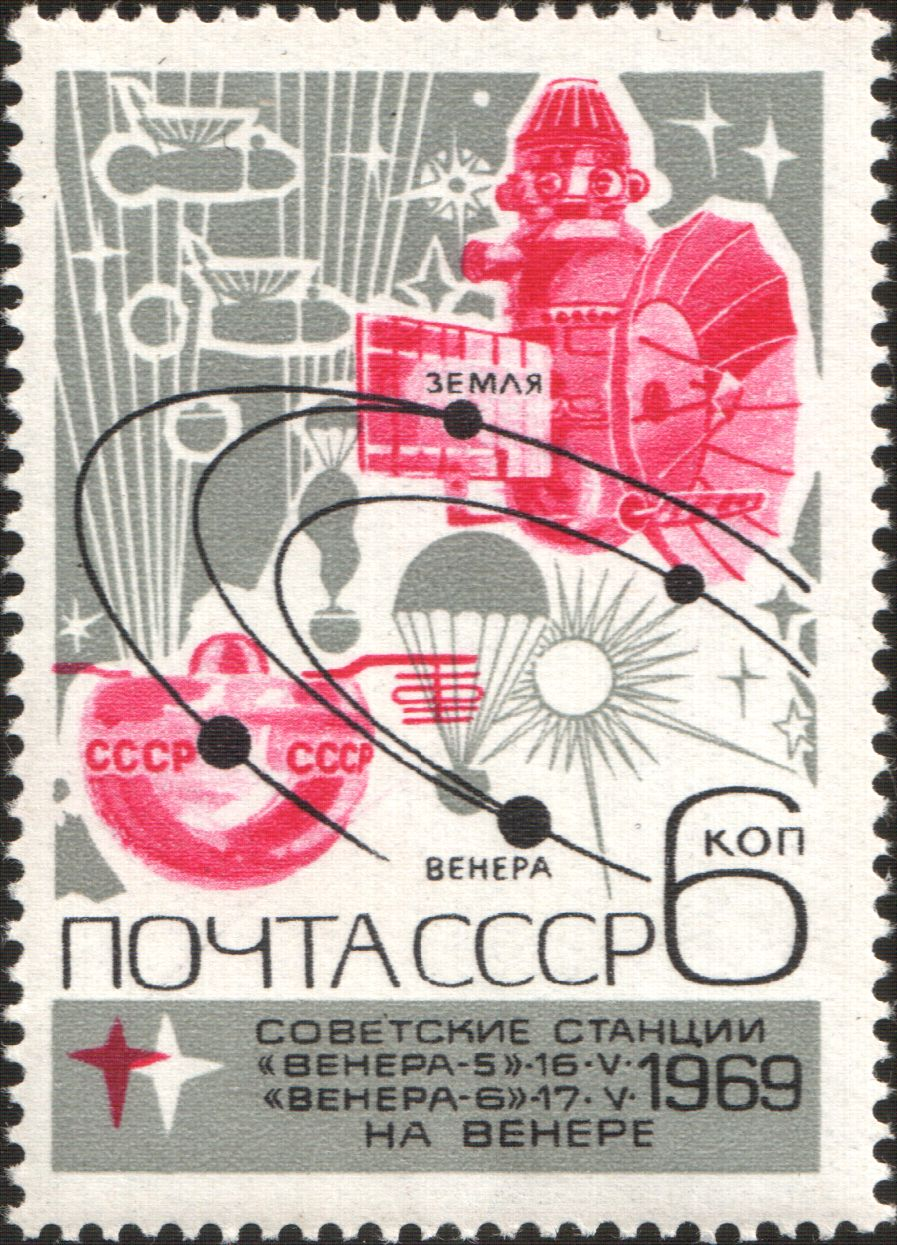
- Venera 6 on a Soviet stamp
- Mission type: Venus atmospheric probe
- Operator: Lavochkin
- COSPAR ID: 1969-002A
- SATCAT no.: 3648
- Mission duration: Travel: 127 days Atmosphere: 51 minutes

Spacecraft properties
- Spacecraft: 2V (V-69) No.331
- Manufacturer: Lavochkin
- Launch mass: 1,130 kg (2,490 lb)
- Dry mass: 410 kg (900 lb)

Start of mission
- Launch date: January 10, 1969, 05:51:52 UTC
- Rocket: Molniya 8K78M
- Launch site: Baikonur 1/5

End of mission
- Last contact: May 17, 1969

Orbital parameters
- Reference system: Heliocentric
- Perihelion altitude: 0.71 AU
- Aphelion altitude: 0.98 AU
- Inclination: 2.0°
- Period: 285 days

Venus atmospheric probe
- Atmospheric entry: May 17, 1969, 06:05 UT
- Impact site: 5°S 23°E (10–12 km altitude)

Venera 6 (Russian: Венера-6 meaning Venus 6), or 2V (V-69) No.331, was a Soviet spacecraft, launched towards Venus to obtain atmospheric data. It had an on-orbit dry mass of 1,130 kg (2,490 lb).

The spacecraft was very similar to Venera 4 although it was of a stronger design. When the atmosphere of Venus was approached, a capsule with a mass of 405 kilograms (893 lb) was jettisoned from the main spacecraft. This capsule contained scientific instruments.

During descent towards the surface of Venus, a parachute opened to slow the rate of descent. For 51 minutes on May 17, 1969, while the capsule was suspended from the parachute, data from the Venusian atmosphere were returned. It landed at 5°S 23°E.

The spacecraft also carried a medallion bearing the State Coat of Arms of the Soviet Union and a bas-relief of Lenin to the night side of Venus.

Given the results from Venera 4, the Venera 5 and Venera 6 landers contained new chemical analysis experiments tuned to provide more precise measurements of the atmosphere's components. Knowing the atmosphere was extremely dense, the parachutes were also made smaller so the capsule would reach its full crush depth before running out of power (as Venera-4 had done).

== Instruments ==
=== Spaceship ===
- Instrument COP-18-3M for the study of cosmic particle streams;
- LA-2U device for determining the distribution of oxygen and hydrogen in the planet's atmosphere.

=== Lander ===
- Pressure sensors MDDA-A type to measure atmospheric pressure in the range from 100 to 30,000 mm Hg Art. (0,13–40 atm);
- G-8 gas analyzers to determine the chemical composition of the atmosphere;
- VIP device for determining the density of the atmosphere at an altitude;
- FD-69 for illumination measurements in the atmosphere;
- EC-164D to determine the temperature at the height of the atmosphere.

== Mission ==
Venera 6 was launched into an Earth parking orbit on January 10, 1969, at 05:51:52 UT and then from a Tyazheliy Sputnik (69-002C) towards Venus. After a mid-course maneuver on March 16 the Venera 6 probe was released on May 17, 1969, 25,000 kilometers (16,000 mi) from the planet.

It entered the nightside atmosphere at 06:05 UT and deployed the parachute. The probe sent back readouts every 45 seconds for 51 minutes and ceased operation due to the temperature and pressure effects at roughly 10 to 12 kilometres (6.2 to 7.5 mi) altitude. The photometer failed to operate, but the atmosphere was sampled at 2 bar and 10 bar pressures.

== See also ==
- List of missions to Venus
