= Venera 2MV-1 No.2 =

Soviet spacecraft launched 1962

2MV-1 No.2
- Mission type: Venus lander
- Operator: OKB-1
- Harvard designation: 1962 Alpha Tau 1
- COSPAR ID: 1962-043A
- SATCAT no.: 381
- Mission duration: Launch failure

Spacecraft properties
- Spacecraft type: 2MV-1
- Manufacturer: OKB-1
- Launch mass: 6,500 kg (14,300 lb)
- Landing mass: 370 kilograms (820 lb)

Start of mission
- Launch date: 1 September 1962, 02:12:30 UTC
- Rocket: Molniya 8K78 s/n T103-13
- Launch site: Baikonur 1/5

End of mission
- Decay date: 6 September 1962

Orbital parameters
- Reference system: Geocentric
- Regime: Low Earth (achieved); Heliocentric (intended)
- Eccentricity: 0.00981
- Perigee altitude: 180 kilometres (110 mi)
- Apogee altitude: 310 kilometres (190 mi)
- Inclination: 64.9 degrees
- Period: 89.4 minutes
- Epoch: 1 September 1962

Venera 2MV-1 No.2, also known as Sputnik 20 in the Western world, was a Soviet spacecraft, which was launched in 1962 as part of the Venera programme. Due to a problem with its upper stage it failed to leave low Earth orbit, and reentered the atmosphere a few days later. It was the second of two Venera 2MV-1 spacecraft, both of which failed to leave Earth orbit. The previous mission, Venera 2MV-1 No.1, was launched several days earlier.

== Launch ==
Venera 2MV-1 No.2 was launched at 02:12:30 UTC on 1 September 1962, atop a Molniya 8K78 carrier rocket flying from Site 1/5 at the Baikonur Cosmodrome. The lower stages of the rocket operated nominally, injecting the fourth stage and payload into a low Earth orbit. Following a coast phase, the upper stage was to have ignited around sixty-one minutes and thirty seconds after launch, in order to place the spacecraft into heliocentric orbit. The ignition command did not reach the engine, however, and the fuel valves did not open, so the upper stage failed to ignite leaving the payload in geocentric orbit. It reentered the atmosphere on 6 September 1962, five days after it had been launched.

== Scientific Instruments ==
The spacecraft bus was equipped with:

- Magnetometer
- Scintillation counter
- Gas Discharge Geiger counters
- Cherenkov detector
- Ion traps
- Cosmic wave detectors
- Micrometeroid detector

And the lander was equipped with:

- Temperature sensors
- Density sensors
- Pressure sensors
- Chemical Gas Analyzer
- Gamma-ray detector
- Mercury level wave motion detector

== Satellite designation ==
The designations Sputnik 24, and later Sputnik 20, were used by the United States Naval Space Command to identify the spacecraft in its Satellite Situation Summary documents, since the Soviet Union did not release the internal designations of its spacecraft at that time, and had not assigned it an official name due to its failure to depart Earth orbit.

== See also ==
- List of missions to Venus
