= 1MV =

Soviet unmanned Venus and Mars probe design

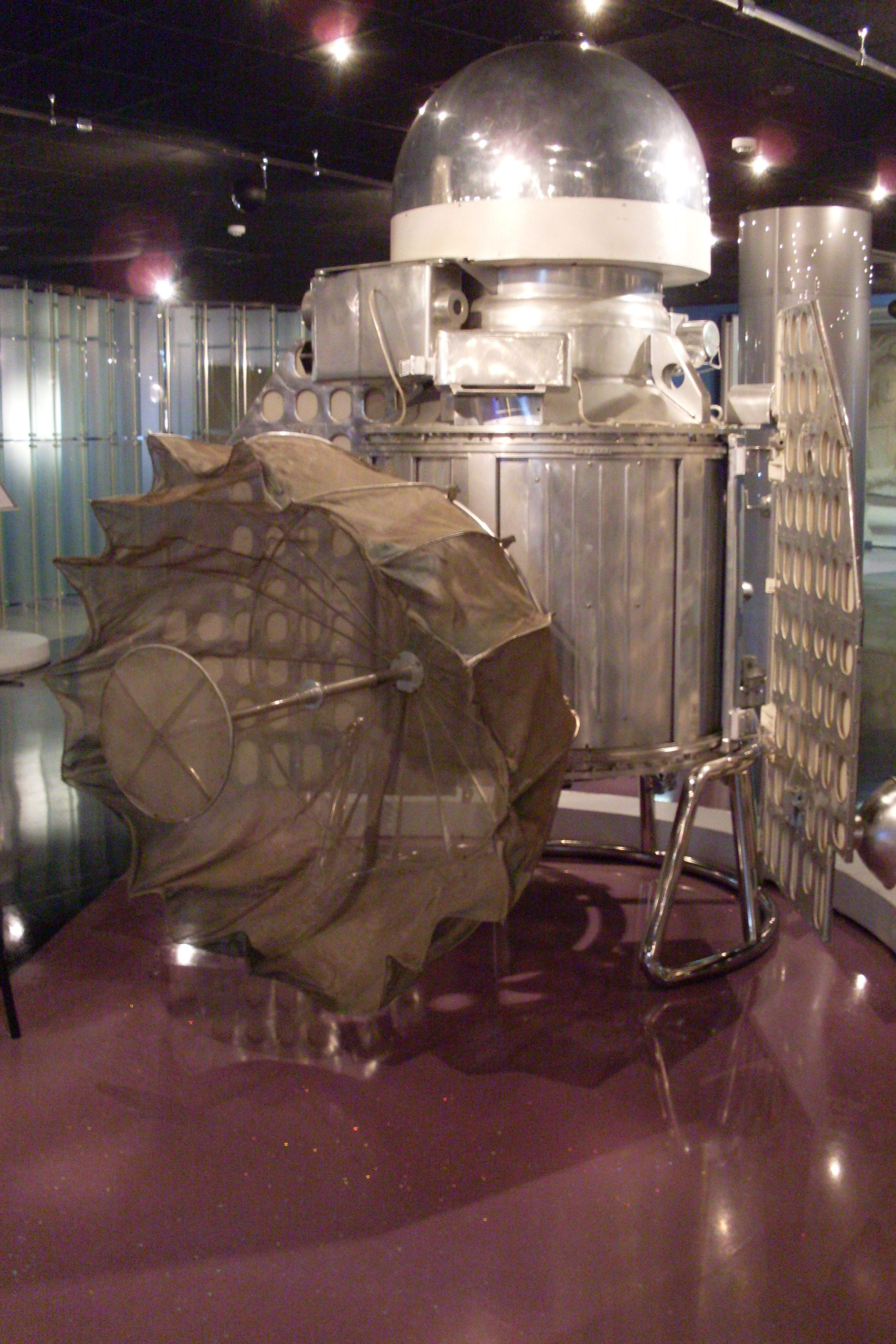
- Manufacturer: OKB-1
- Country of origin: Soviet Union
- Operator: Soviet Space Program

Specifications
- Launch mass: 640kg

Production
- Operational: 1960-1961

The 1MV planetary probe (short for 1st generation Mars-Venus) is a designation for a common design used by early Soviet uncrewed probes to Mars and Venus. It was standard practice of the Soviet space program to use standardized components as much as possible.

All probes shared the same general characteristics and differed only in equipment necessary for specific missions. Each probe also incorporated improvements based on experience with earlier missions.

It was superseded by the 2MV family on July 30, 1961.

== Background ==
Studies in early 1957 showed that there would optimal launch windows for Mars in 1958 and to Venus in 1959. The 1M and 1V probes would be sent on direct ascent escape trajectories on the same 8K72 rockets used in previous Luna missions, however, by the end of 1958, theoretical studies had discovered a better method of launch, first going into orbit and then, in a separate burn to interplanetary space. This method allowed the launch requirements to be much more relaxed while allowing for a heavier payload. In early 1959, the direct ascent escape method was abandoned and a new rocket was hurriedly developed called 8K78, later known as "Molniya".

With no launch vehicle available and delays in the development of 1V, it became clear that the 1959 Venus launch window would be missed. However, as the US also cancelled their plans for a Venus flyby and the next interplanetary mission wasn't scheduled to launch until 1962, OKB-1 still had a chance to conduct the first flyby of Venus. Since the launch windows were only months apart, the 1M and 1V probes would share a unified design, the 1MV. On December 10th 1959, the Soviet government officially approved the 1MV missions.

== Variants ==
- Mars 1M: Mars probe 1M No.1 (failure), Mars probe 1M No.2 (failure)
- Venera 1VA: Sputnik 7 (1VA No.1), Venera 1 (1VA No.2, Sputnik 8)

== See also ==
- Soviet space program
- Venera
- 2MV
