= Mars 1 =

Soviet space probe launched in 1962

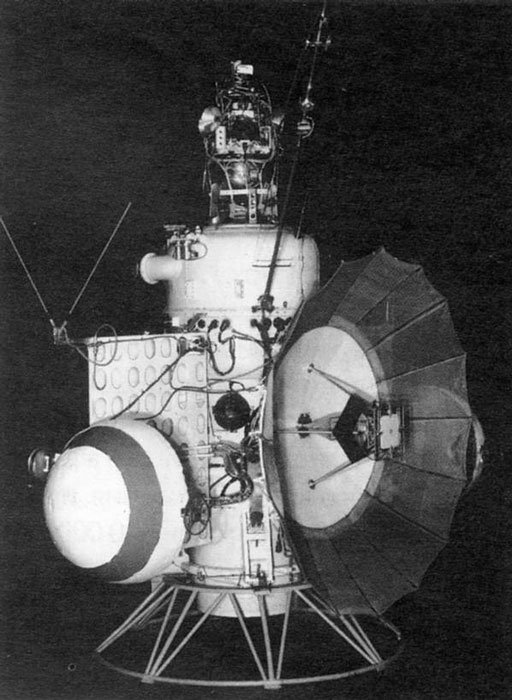
- Mission type: Mars flyby
- Operator: Soviet Union
- COSPAR ID: 1962-061C
- SATCAT no.: 450
- Mission duration: 4 months 21 days

Spacecraft properties
- Spacecraft: 2MV-4 No.2
- Manufacturer: OKB-1
- Launch mass: 893.5 kg

Start of mission
- Launch date: 1 November 1962, 16:14 UTC
- Rocket: Molniya 8K78
- Launch site: Baikonur 1/5

End of mission
- Disposal: Spacecraft loss
- Last contact: 21 March 1963

Orbital parameters
- Reference system: Heliocentric

Flyby of Mars
- Closest approach: 19 June 1963
- Distance: 193,000 kilometres (120,000 mi)
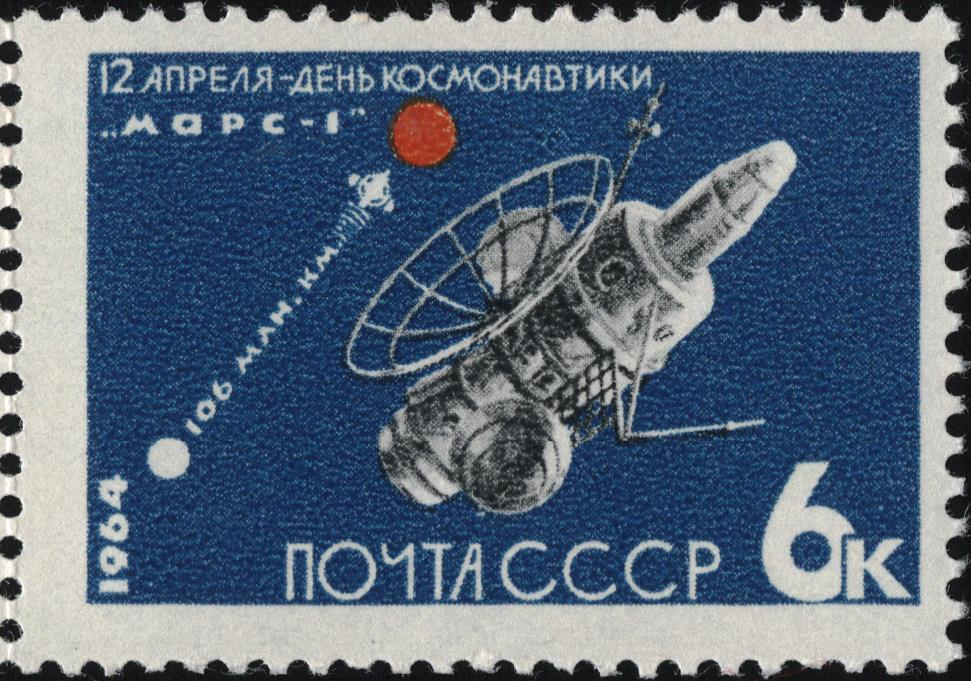
- Mars 1 stamp Mars program

Mars 1, also known as 1962 Beta Nu 1, Mars 2MV-4 and Sputnik 23, was an automatic interplanetary station launched in the direction of Mars on November 1, 1962, the first of the Soviet Mars probe program, with the intent of flying by the planet at a distance of about 11,000 km (6,800 mi). It was designed to image the surface and send back data on cosmic radiation, micrometeoroid impacts and Mars's magnetic field, radiation environment, atmospheric structure, and possible organic compounds.

After leaving Earth orbit, the spacecraft and the Molniya booster's fourth stage separated and the solar panels were deployed. Early telemetry indicated that there was a leak in one of the gas valves in the orientation system so the spacecraft was transferred to gyroscopic stabilization. It made sixty-one radio transmissions, initially at two-day intervals and later at five days, containing a large amount of interplanetary data.

On March 21, 1963, when the spacecraft was at a distance of 106,760,000 km (66,340,000 mi) from Earth on its way to Mars, communications ceased, probably due to failure of the spacecraft's antenna orientation system. Mars 1's closest approach to Mars probably occurred on June 19, 1963 at a distance of approximately 193,000 km (120,000 mi), after which the spacecraft entered an orbit around the Sun.

== Spacecraft design ==
Mars 1 was a modified Venera-type spacecraft in the shape of a cylinder 3.3 m (11 ft) long and 1 m (3.3 ft) in diameter. The spacecraft measured 4 m (13 ft) across with the solar panels and radiators deployed. The cylinder was divided into two compartments. The upper 2.7 m (8.9 ft), the orbital module, contained guidance and on-board propulsion systems. The experiment module, containing the scientific instrumentation, comprised the bottom 0.6 m (2.0 ft) of the cylinder. A 1.7 m (5.6 ft) parabolic high gain antenna was used for communication, along with an omnidirectional antenna and a semi-directional antenna. Power was supplied by two solar panel wings with a total area of 2.6 m^{2} (28 sq ft) affixed to opposite sides of the spacecraft. Power was stored in a 42 ampere-hour cadmium-nickel battery.

External image
- The 8K78 launcher, carrying the Mars-1 probe, blasts off from Baikonur. Credit: RKK Energia

Mars 1 was equipped with three primary radio systems operating at wavelengths of 1.6 meters, 32 centimeters, and in the centimeter range (5 and 8 centimeters). The 32-centimeter wavelength transmitter, situated in the orbital module, utilized a high-gain antenna, primarily transmitting on 922.76 MHz. It was supplemented by the 1.6-meter wavelength transmitter, linked with omnidirectional antennae on the solar panels, which operated on 183.6 MHz for downlink and likely near 102 MHz for uplink, serving both for telemetry and as a backup communication system in case of orientation system failure.

For detailed observations, the 8-centimeter wavelength transmitter in the experiment module was dedicated to transmitting television images, utilizing a signal coherent with the main 922.76 MHz link but at a higher frequency of 3691.04 MHz. Additionally, an impulse transmitter operating in the 5-centimeter band (around 5840-5890 MHz range) was also housed in the experiment module. This system, characterized by impulse modulation, was designed to transmit image data at approximately 90 pixels/sec using pulse-position modulation, with an average power consumption of 50 watts and peak power of 25 kilowatts per pulse.

The Mars 1 station was initially programmed for automatic data transmission every two days, later adjusted to every five days post December 13. Ground commands could also trigger transmissions from the station as required.

Temperature control was achieved using a binary gas–liquid system and hemispherical radiators mounted on the ends of the solar panels. The craft carried various scientific instruments including a magnetometer probe, television photographic equipment, a spectroreflexometer, radiation sensors (gas-discharge and scintillation counters), a spectrograph to study ozone absorption bands, and a micrometeoroid instrument.

== Scientific results ==
- The probe recorded one micrometeorite strike every two minutes at altitudes ranging from 6,000 to 40,000 km (3,700 to 24,900 mi) from Earth's surface due to the Taurids meteor shower, and also recorded similar densities at distances from 20 to 40 million kilometres (12,000,000 to 25,000,000 mi) from Earth.
- Magnetic field intensities of 3–4 nanoteslas (nT, also known as gammas) with peaks as high as 6–9 nT were measured in interplanetary space.
- The solar wind was detected.
- The radiation zones around Earth were detected, and their magnitude confirmed.

== Designation ==
This spacecraft is also referenced as Sputnik 23 and Mars 2MV-4. It was originally designated Sputnik 30 in the U.S. Naval Space Command Satellite Situation Summary.

Although it was called Mars 1, there were at least three other probes prior to this, that were failures: Mars 2MV-4 No.1, Mars 1M No.2, and Mars 1M No.1

== See also ==
- Exploration of Mars
- List of missions to Mars
- Marsnik program
- Space exploration
- Unmanned space missions
