= Mars 1M No.2 =

Soviet Mars spacecraft

1M No.2
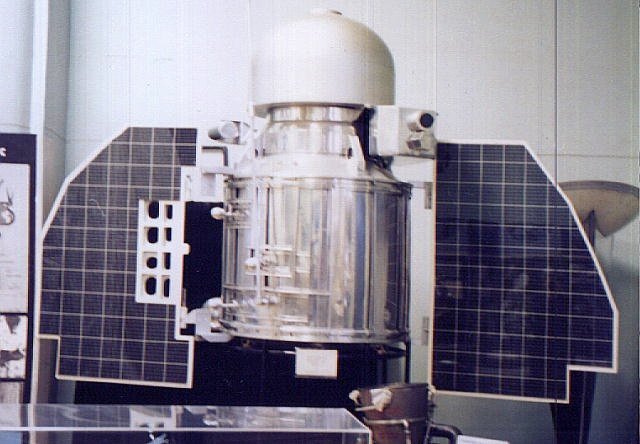
- A Mars 1M spacecraft
- Mission type: Mars flyby
- Mission duration: Failed to orbit

Spacecraft properties
- Spacecraft type: Mars 1M
- Manufacturer: OKB-1
- Launch mass: 650 kilograms (1,430 lb)

Start of mission
- Launch date: 14 October 1960, 13:51:03 UTC
- Rocket: Molniya
- Launch site: Baikonur 1/5

Mars 1M No.2, designated Mars 1960B by NASA analysts and dubbed Marsnik 2 by the Western media, was a spacecraft launched as part of the Soviet Union's Mars programme, which was lost in a launch failure in 1960. 1M No.2, which was intended to explore Mars from flyby trajectory, was destroyed after its Molniya carrier rocket failed to achieve orbit.

== Launch ==
Mars 1M No.2 was the second Mars 1M spacecraft to be launched, lifting off four days after its sister craft, Mars 1M No.1, had been lost during the Molniya 8K78 rocket's maiden flight. 1M No.2 was carried by another Molniya, which had the serial number L1-5M. The launch took place from Site 1/5 at the Baikonur Cosmodrome, with liftoff occurring at 13:51:03 UTC on 14 October 1960.

During preparations for the launch, an oxidiser leak in the second stage caused liquid oxygen, at cryogenic temperature, to spill around the engine's fuel inlet valve. This froze the stage's RP-1 propellant, leaving the engine unable to ignite. As a result, the spacecraft failed to achieve Earth orbit.It was planned to conduct its flyby on 15 May 1961.

== Scientific Instruments ==
The spacecraft carried three scientific instruments in order to investigate Mars. They are as follows

- Ultraviolet Spectrometer (Removed)
- Radiation Detector
- Ion Traps
- Magnetometer
- Micrometeorite Detector
- Cosmic-ray Detectors
- Television Imaging System (Removed)
- Spectroreflectometer (Removed)

The Television Imaging System, Ultraviolet Spectrometer and Spectroreflectometer were removed before launch because of weight restrictions.

== See also ==
- List of missions to Mars
- List of Mars landers
- List of artificial objects on Mars
- List of human mars missions
