= Venera 5 =

Soviet space probe to Venus in 1969

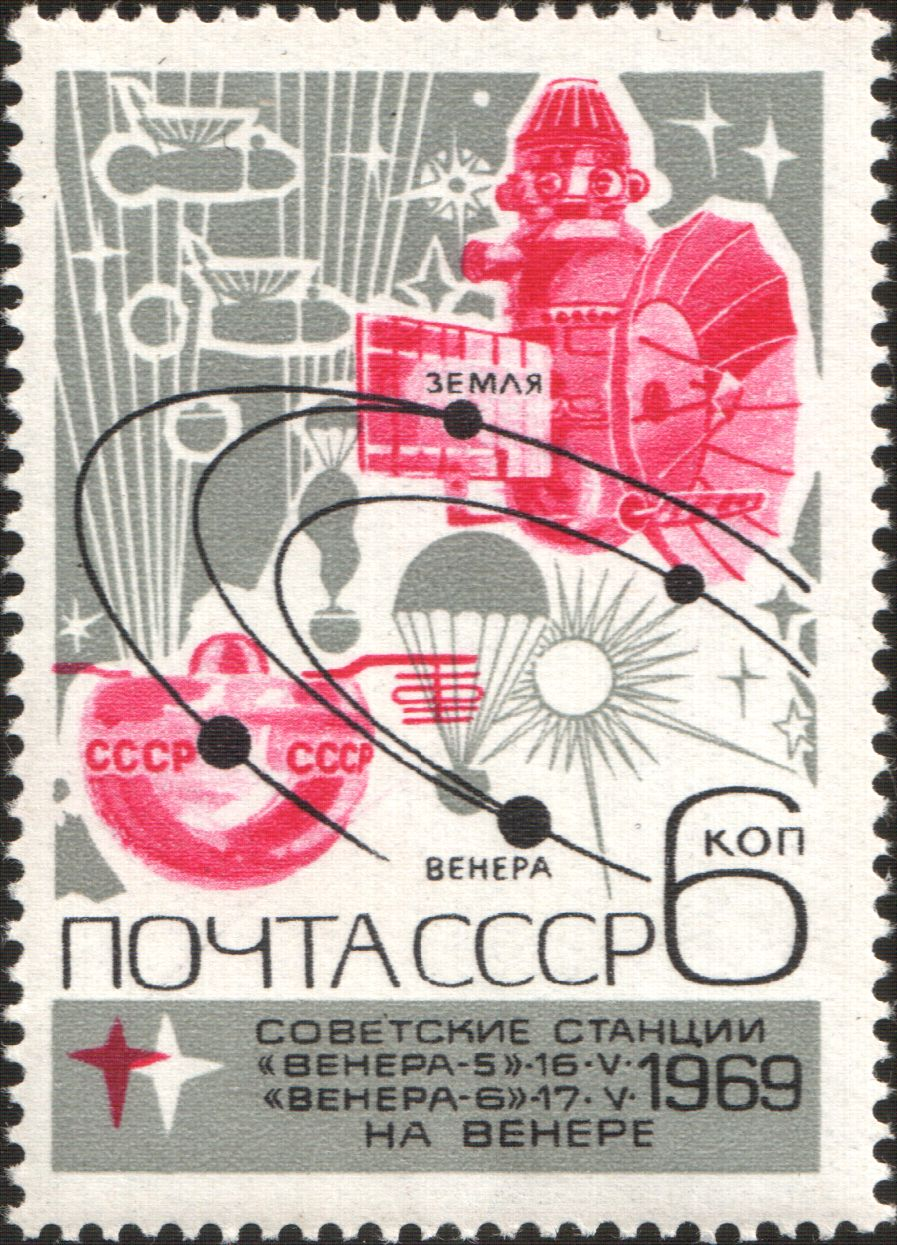
- Venera 5 on a Soviet stamp
- Mission type: Venus atmospheric probe
- Operator: Lavochkin
- COSPAR ID: 1969-001A
- SATCAT no.: 3642
- Mission duration: Travel: 131 days Atmosphere: 53 minutes

Spacecraft properties
- Spacecraft: 2V (V-69) No. 330
- Manufacturer: Lavochkin
- Launch mass: 1,130 kg (2,490 lb)
- Dry mass: 410 kg (900 lb)

Start of mission
- Launch date: 5 January 1969, 06:28:08 UTC
- Rocket: Molniya 8K78M
- Launch site: Baikonur 1/5

End of mission
- Last contact: 16 May 1969, 06:54 UTC

Orbital parameters
- Reference system: Heliocentric
- Perihelion altitude: 0.72 AU
- Aphelion altitude: 0.98 AU
- Inclination: 2.0°
- Period: 286 days

Venus atmospheric probe
- Atmospheric entry: 16 May 1969, 06:01 UTC
- Impact site: 3°S 18°E (24–26 km altitude)

Venera 5 (Russian: Венера-5 meaning Venus 5) was a space probe in the Soviet space program Venera for the exploration of Venus.

Venera 5 was launched towards Venus to obtain atmospheric data. The spacecraft was very similar to Venera 4 although it was of a stronger design. The launch was conducted using a Molniya-M rocket, flying from the Baikonur Cosmodrome.

When the atmosphere of Venus was approached, a capsule weighing 405 kg (893 lb) and containing scientific instruments was jettisoned from the main spacecraft. During satellite descent towards the surface of Venus, a parachute opened to slow the rate of descent. For 53 minutes on 16 May 1969, while the capsule was suspended from the parachute, data from the Venusian atmosphere were returned. It landed at 3°S 18°E. The spacecraft also carried a medallion bearing the State Coat of Arms of the Soviet Union and a bas-relief of Lenin to the night side of Venus.

Given the results from Venera 4, the Venera 5 and Venera 6 landers contained new chemical analysis experiments tuned to provide more precise measurements of the atmosphere's components. Knowing the atmosphere was extremely dense, the parachutes were also made smaller so the capsule would reach its full crush depth before running out of power (as Venera 4 had done).

== Instruments ==
=== Spaceship ===
- Instrument KS-18-3M to study the flows of cosmic particles;
- Instrument LA-2U to determine the distribution of oxygen and hydrogen in the planet's atmosphere.

=== Lander ===
- Pressure sensors MDDA A to measure atmospheric pressure in the range of 13 to 4,000 kilopascals (100 to 30,000 mmHg);
- G-8 gas analyzers to determine the chemical composition of the atmosphere;
- TTI unit to determine the density of the atmosphere at an altitude;
- FD-69 for atmospheric lighting measurements;
- CE-164D to determine the temperature at the height of the atmosphere.

== Mission ==
Venera 5 was launched into an Earth parking orbit on 5 January 1969 at 06:28:08 UTC and then from a Tyazheliy Sputnik (69-001C) towards Venus. After a mid-course maneuver on 14 March 1969, the probe was released from the bus on 16 May 1969 at a distance of 37,000 km (23,000 mi) from Venus. The probe entered the nightside atmosphere at 06:01 UTC and when the velocity slowed to 210 m/s the parachute deployed and transmissions to Earth began. The probe sent read-outs every 45 seconds for 53 minutes before finally succumbing to the temperature and pressure at roughly 320 °C (608 °F) and 2,610 kilopascals (26.1 bar).

The photometer detected a light level of 250 watts per square meter and confirmed the high temperatures, pressures, and carbon dioxide composition of the atmosphere found by Venera 4.

== See also ==
- List of missions to Venus
