= Venera 2MV-2 No.1 =

Failed Soviet Venus flyby spacecraft

2MV-2 No.1
- Mission type: Venus flyby
- Operator: OKB-1
- Harvard designation: 1962 Alpha Phi 1
- COSPAR ID: 1962-045A
- SATCAT no.: 389
- Mission duration: Launch failure

Spacecraft properties
- Spacecraft type: 2MV-2
- Manufacturer: OKB-1
- Launch mass: 6,500 kilograms (14,300 lb)

Start of mission
- Launch date: 12 September 1962, 00:59:13 UTC
- Rocket: Molniya 8K78 s/n T103-14
- Launch site: Baikonur 1/5

End of mission
- Decay date: 14 September 1962

Orbital parameters
- Reference system: Geocentric
- Regime: Low Earth (achieved); Heliocentric (intended)
- Semi-major axis: 6,550 kilometres (4,070 mi)
- Eccentricity: 0.02977
- Perigee altitude: 163 kilometres (101 mi)
- Apogee altitude: 195 kilometres (121 mi)
- Inclination: 64.8 degrees
- Period: 88.07 minutes
- Epoch: 1962-09-11, 21:40:00 UTC

Venera 2MV-2 No.1, also known as Sputnik 21 in the West, was a Soviet spacecraft, which was launched in 1962 as part of the Venera programme, and was intended to make a flyby of Venus. Due to a problem with the rocket which launched it, it failed to leave low Earth orbit, and reentered the atmosphere a few days later. It was the only Venera 2MV-2 spacecraft ever launched.

== Launch ==
Venera 2MV-2 No.1 was launched at 00:59:13 UTC on 12 September 1962, atop a Molniya 8K78 carrier rocket flying from Site 1/5 at the Baikonur Cosmodrome. The rocket performed nominally until cutoff of the Blok I stage, following injection into a low Earth orbit. Following cutoff, one of the oxidiser valves failed to close, and liquid oxygen was allowed to flow into the combustion chamber of one of the vernier thrusters. The vernier thruster exploded at T+531 seconds, causing the rocket to tumble out of control. This led to the formation of bubbles in the upper stage oxidiser pump, which caused the upper stage engine to fail less than a second after ignition. It reentered the atmosphere on 14 September 1962, two days after it had been launched.

== Scientific Instruments ==
=== Spacecraft Bus ===
- Magnetometer
- Scintillation counter
- Gas Discharge Geiger counters
- Cherenkov detector
- Ion traps
- Cosmic Wave detector
- Micrometeoroid detector

=== Instrument module ===
- Imaging system
- Ultraviolet spectrometer
- Infrared spectrometer

== Spacecraft designation ==
The designations Sputnik 25, and later Sputnik 21, were used by the United States Naval Space Command to identify the spacecraft in its Satellite Situation Summary documents, since the Soviet Union did not release the internal designations of its spacecraft at that time, and had not assigned it an official name due to its failure to depart geocentric orbit.

== See also ==
- List of missions to Venus
