= List of artificial objects on Mars =

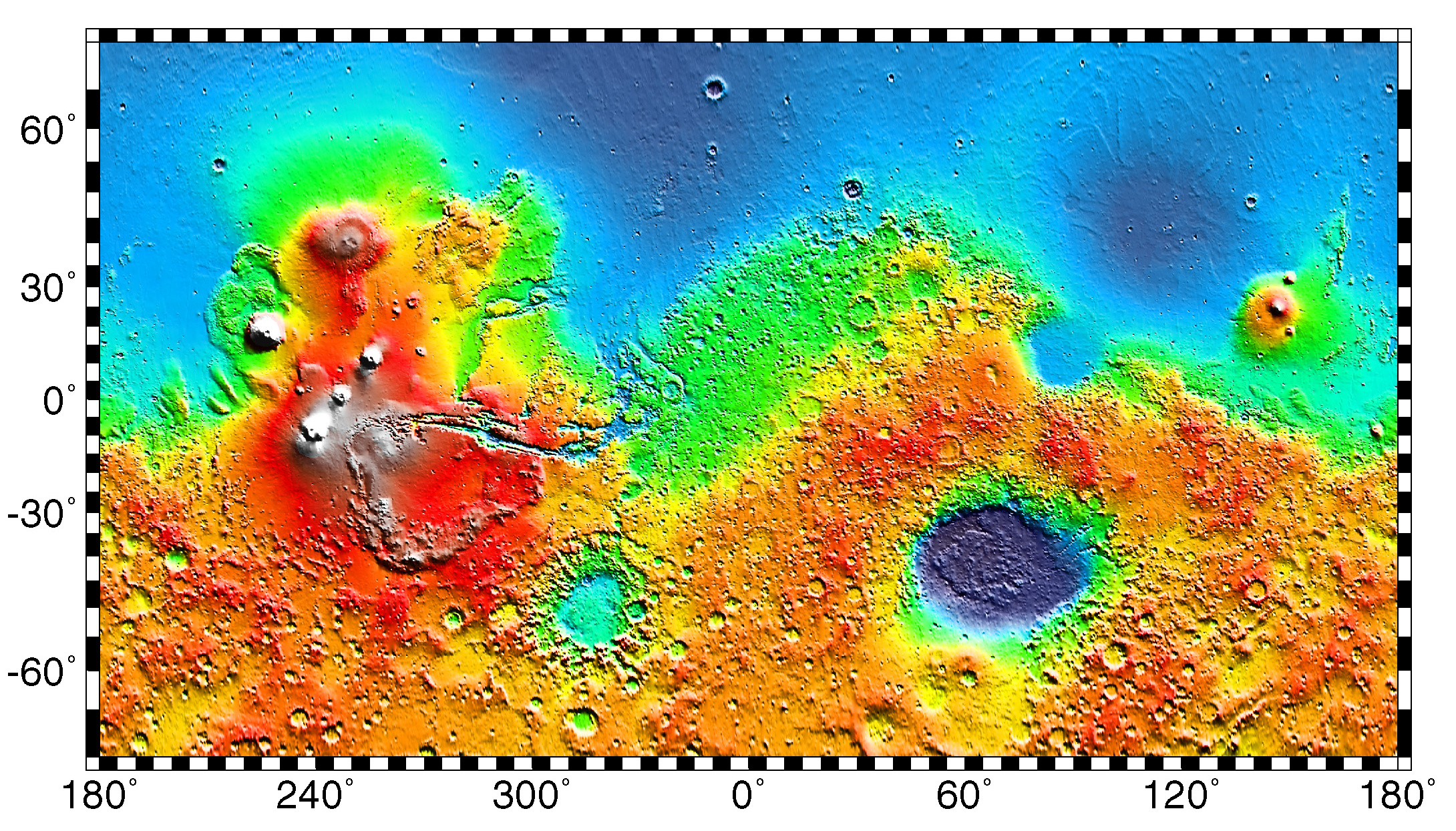

Interactive image map of the global topography of Mars, overlaid with the position of Martian rovers and landers. Orange indicates active rovers, coloring of the base map indicates relative elevations of Martian surface.

Clickable image: Clicking on the labels will open a new article.
( Active • Inactive)
(See also: Mars map; Mars Memorials list)

The following table is a partial list of artificial objects on the surface of Mars, consisting of spacecraft which were launched from Earth. Although most are defunct after having served their purpose, the Curiosity and Perseverance rovers are active. China's Tianwen-1 spacecraft is the most recent artificial object to land safely on Mars.

The table does not include smaller objects, such as springs, fragments, parachutes and heat shields. As of February 2021, there are 14 missions with objects on the surface of Mars. Some of these missions contain multiple spacecraft.

== List of landers and vehicles ==
Key
Success
Operational
Failure

Year	Agency	Mission	Object(s)	Image	Mass (kg)	Status	Location
1971	USSR	Mars 2	Mars 2 lander and PrOP-M rover		1210	Failure during descent; crashed on surface	Estimated at 45°S 313°W
1971	USSR	Mars 3	Mars 3 lander and PrOP-M rover		1210	Transmission failure 110 seconds after soft landing	Estimated at Sirenum Terra 45°S 158°W
1973	USSR	Mars 6	Mars 6 lander		635	Returned corrupted data for 224 seconds during its descent but contact lost before reaching surface	Estimated at Margaritifer Terra 23.90°S 19.42°W
1976	NASA	Viking 1	Viking 1 lander		657	Operated 2245 sols. Last contact Nov 11, 1982	Chryse Planitia 22.697°N 48.222°W
1976	NASA	Viking 2	Viking 2 lander		657	Operated 1281 sols. Last contact Apr 11, 1980	Utopia Planitia 48.269°N 225.990°W
1997	NASA	Mars Pathfinder	Pathfinder (lander)		360	Operated 83 sols. Last contact Sep 27, 1997	Ares Vallis 19.33°N 33.55°W
1997	NASA	Mars Pathfinder	Sojourner (rover)		11.5	Operated 83 sols. Last contact Sep 27, 1997	Ares Vallis 19.33°N 33.55°W
1999	NASA	Mars Surveyor '98	Mars Polar Lander and Deep Space 2 (probes)		500	Unknown failure during descent; crashed on surface	Estimated at Ultimi Scopuli 76°S 195°W
2003	ESA (UK)	Mars Express	Beagle 2 (lander)		33.2	Landed safely; solar panels failed to deploy	Isidis Planitia 11.5265°N 90.4295°E
2004	NASA	Mars Exploration Rover	Spirit (rover)		185	Operated 2210 sols. Last contact Mar 22, 2010	Gusev crater 14.5718°S 175.4785°E
2004	NASA	Mars Exploration Rover	Opportunity (rover)		185	Operated 5111 sols. Last contact June 10, 2018	Meridiani Planum 1.9462°S 354.4734°E
2008	NASA	Phoenix Mars Lander	Phoenix (lander)		350	Operated 155 sols. Last contact Nov 2, 2008	Green Valley in Vastitas Borealis 68.22°N 125.7°W
2012	NASA	Mars Science Laboratory	Curiosity (rover)		900	In operation, 5007 sols	Aeolis Palus in Gale Crater 4.5895°S 137.4417°E
2016	ESA Roscosmos	ExoMars 2016	Schiaparelli EDM (lander)		577	Crashed on impact; transmitted descent telemetry	Meridiani Planum 2.05°S 6.21°W
2018	NASA	InSight	InSight (lander)		358	Reached end of designed lifespan after landing on 19 Dec 2022.	Elysium Planitia 4.5024°N 135.6234°E
2021	NASA	Mars 2020	Perseverance (rover)		1024	In operation, 1973 sols	Jezero crater 18.4457°N 77.4508°E
2021	NASA	Mars 2020	Ingenuity (helicopter)		1.8	Operated 1973 sols.	Wright Brothers Field 18.4457°N 77.4508°E
2021	CNSA	Tianwen-1	Tianwen-1 (lander)		1285	Reached end of designed lifespan after landing on 14 May 2021.	Utopia Planitia 25.1°N 109.9°E
2021	CNSA	Tianwen-1	Zhurong (rover)		240	Inactive due to sandstorm. Operated for 361 sols.	Utopia Planitia 25.1°N 109.9°E
2021	CNSA	Tianwen-1	Tianwen-1 Remote camera		<1	Reached end of designed lifespan after mission completion on 1 June 2021.	Utopia Planitia 25.1°N 109.9°E

== Other objects ==
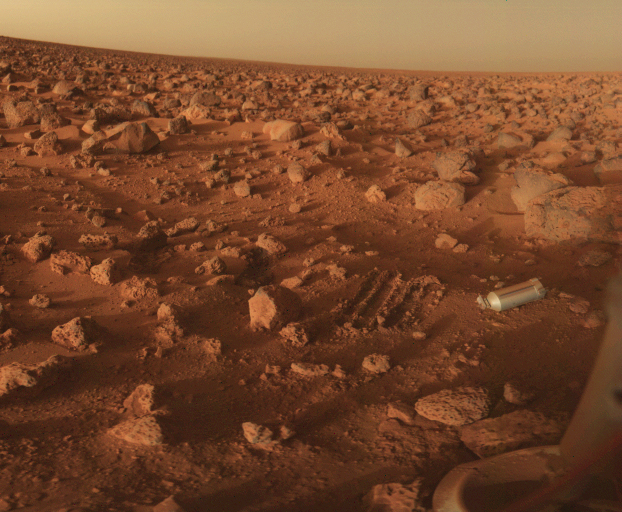
An example of an additional object from a spacecraft landing is the metal shroud ejected by the Viking 2 lander, as seen in this 1977 view of Mars. The shroud covered the surface sampler instrument and could be seen in images taken by the lander while it was active on the surface.

- Each mission left debris according to its design. For example, the Schiaparelli EDM lander likely exploded on impact, creating an unknown number of fragments at one location. At another location, there may be a lower heat shield, and at another location, a parachute and upper heat shield. Another example is the counterweights ejected by MSL during its descent. In some cases, the nature and location of this additional debris has been determined and, in other cases, even the location of the main spacecraft has remained unknown. The identification of Beagle 2 after 11 years is one of the greatest breakthroughs yet, since prior to that, it could not be confirmed what had happened. Spacecraft that have not been precisely located include Mars 2, Mars 3, Mars 6, Mars Polar Lander, and the two Deep Space 2 probes.
- Orbiters whose orbit could eventually decay and impact the surface, include: Viking 1 and Viking 2 orbiters, Mars Reconnaissance Orbiter, 2001 Mars Odyssey, Mars Express, Mars Global Surveyor, Phobos 2, Mars 2, Mars 3, and Mars 5 orbiters, and Mariner 9. (See also List of Mars orbiters)
- The fate of Mars Climate Orbiter (1999) is unknown, but it is thought to have burnt up in the atmosphere before impacting.
- Mariner 9, which entered Mars orbit in 1971, is expected to remain in orbit until approximately 2022, when the spacecraft is projected to enter the Martian atmosphere and either burn up or crash into the planet's surface.

== Gallery ==
=== From surface ===
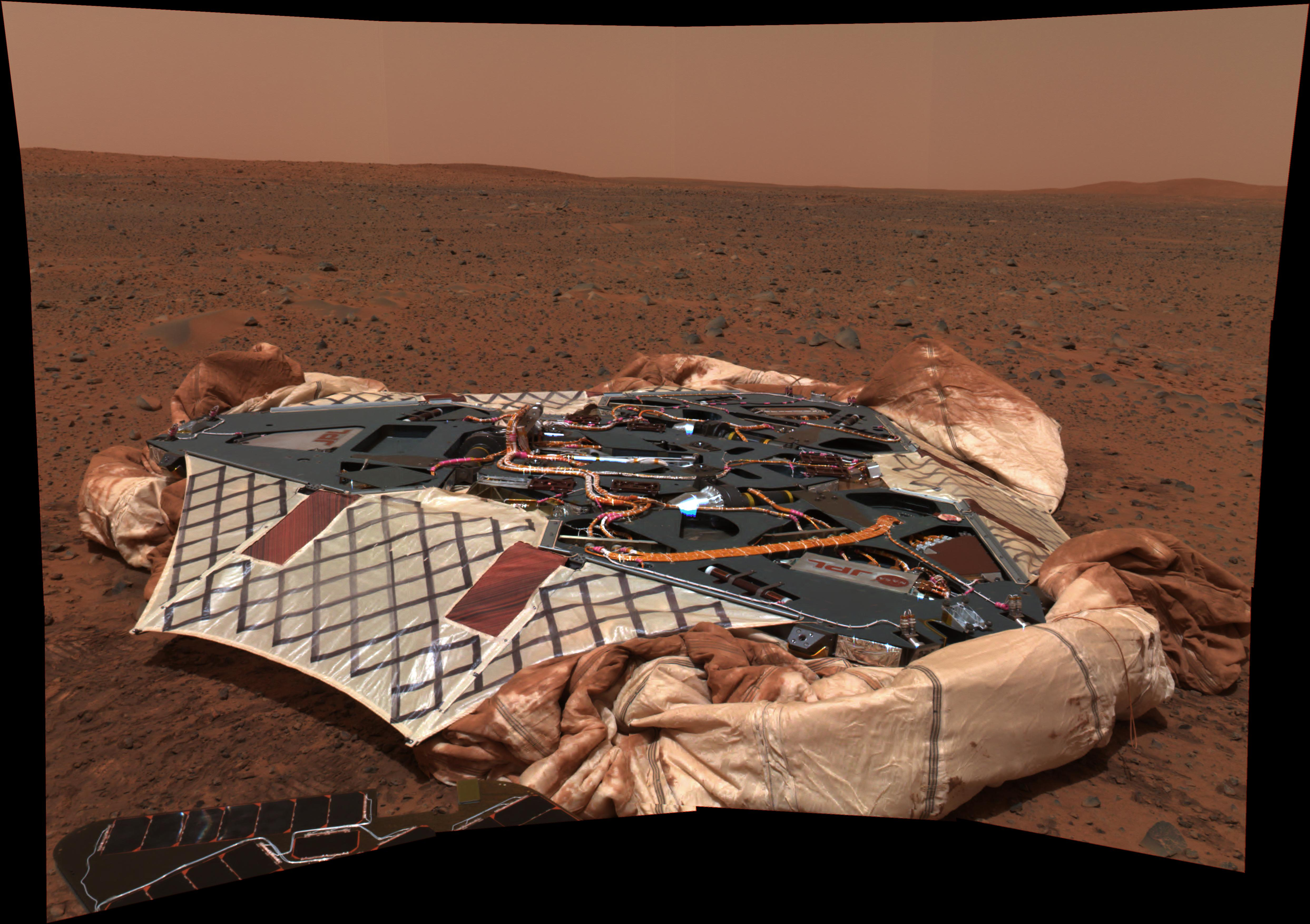
MER-A Spirit rover lander

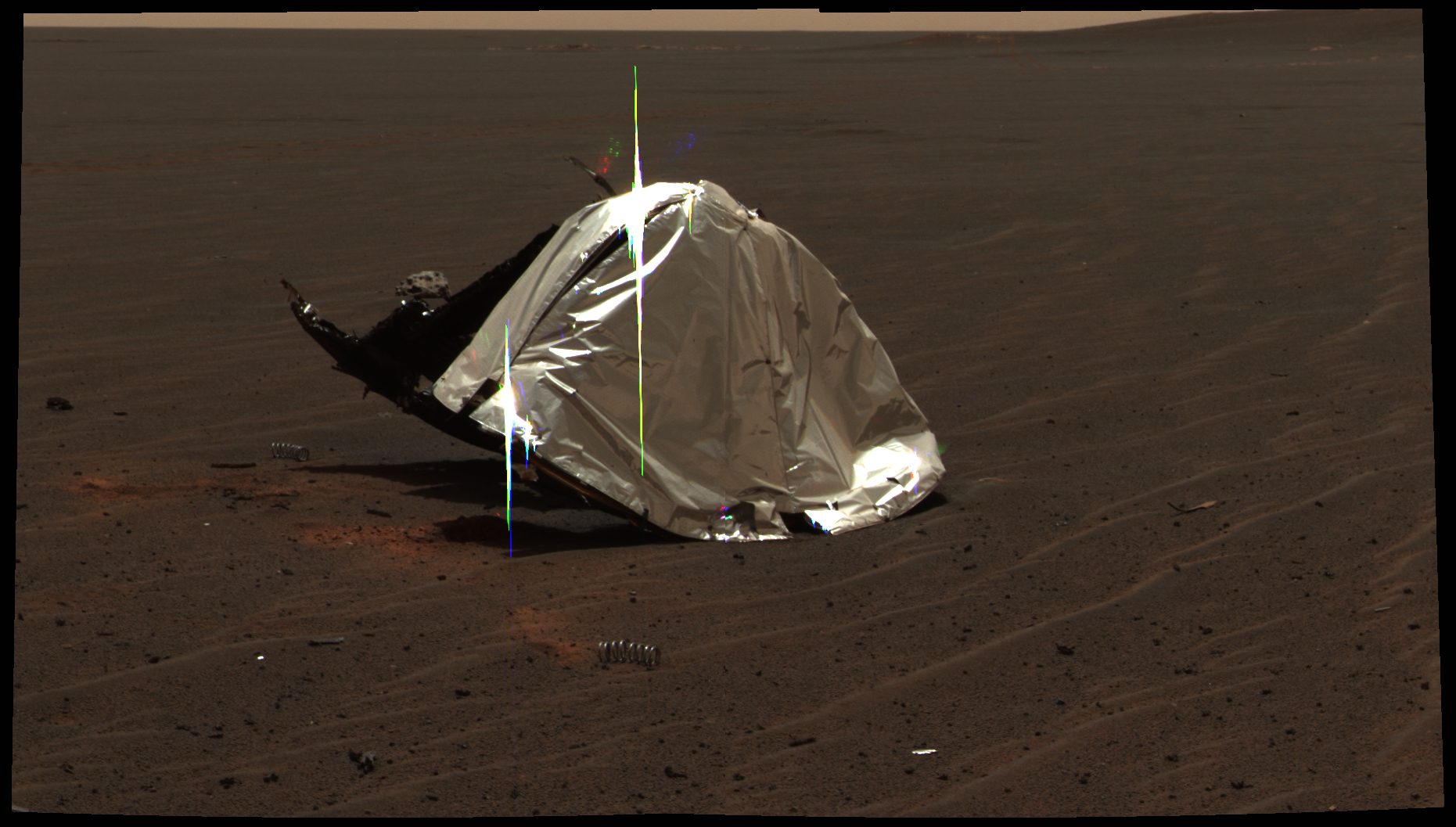
MER-B Opportunity's heat shield

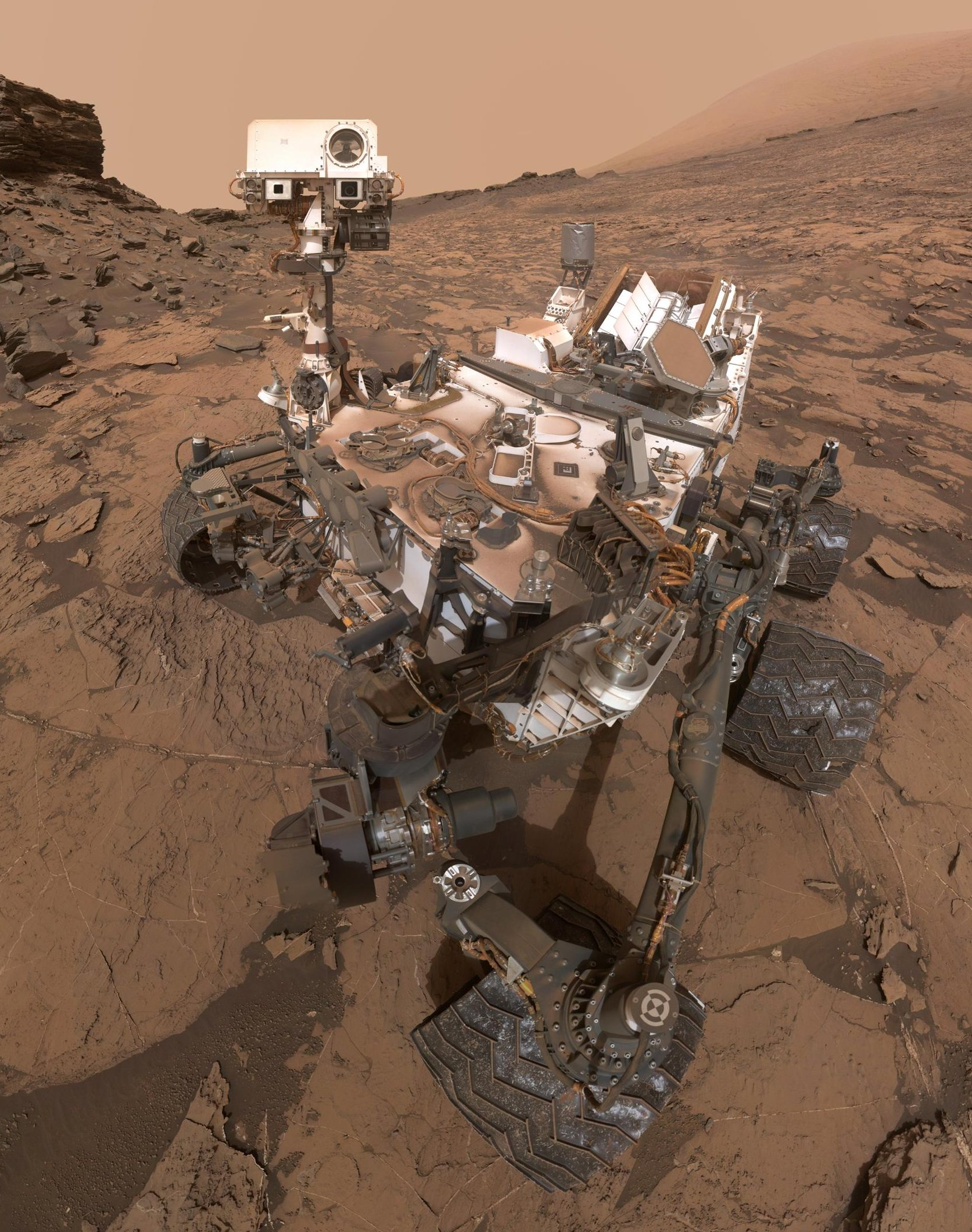
MSL Curiosity self-portrait, 2016

=== From orbit ===
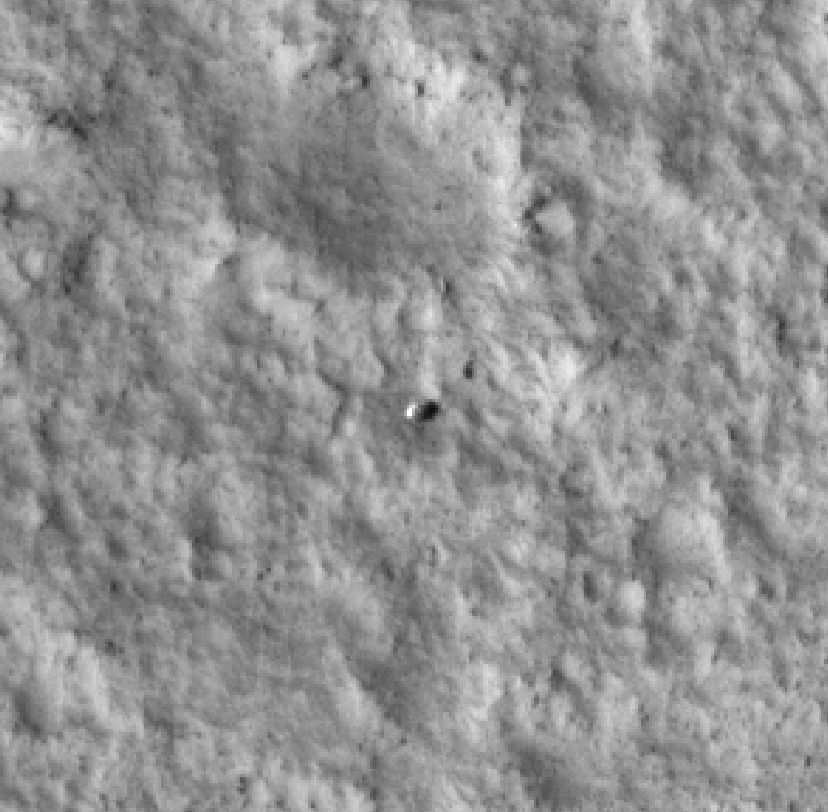
Viking 1 lander in 2006 (HiRise)

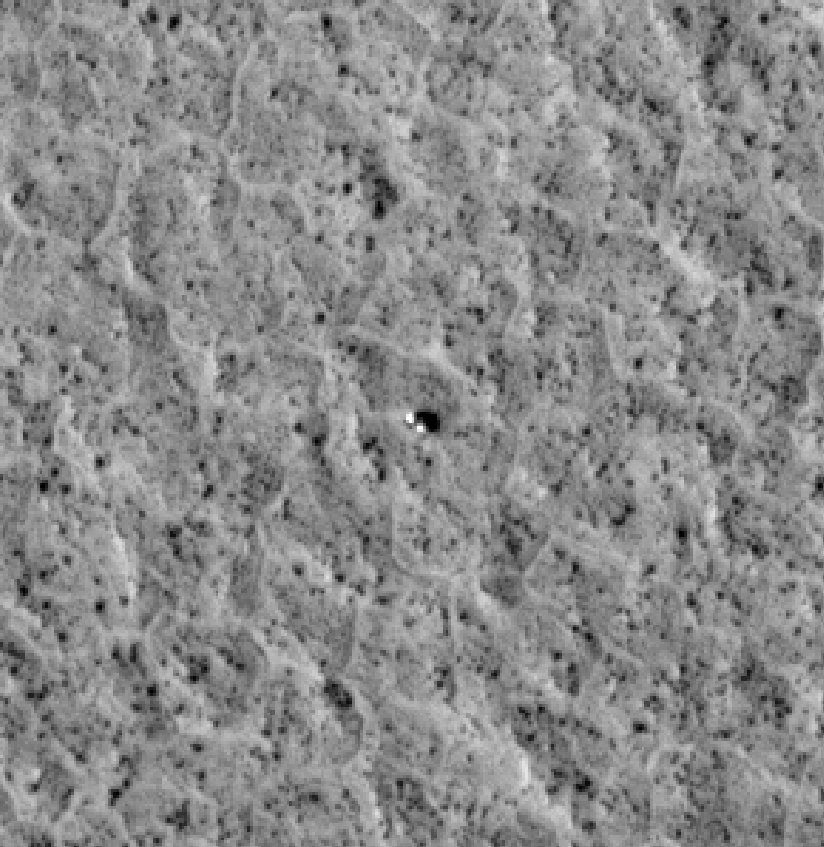
Viking 2 lander in 2006 (HiRise)

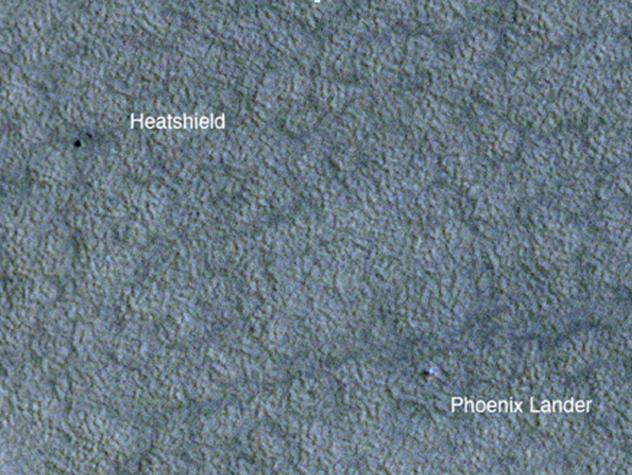
Phoenix lander and heat-shield in 2009 (HiRise)

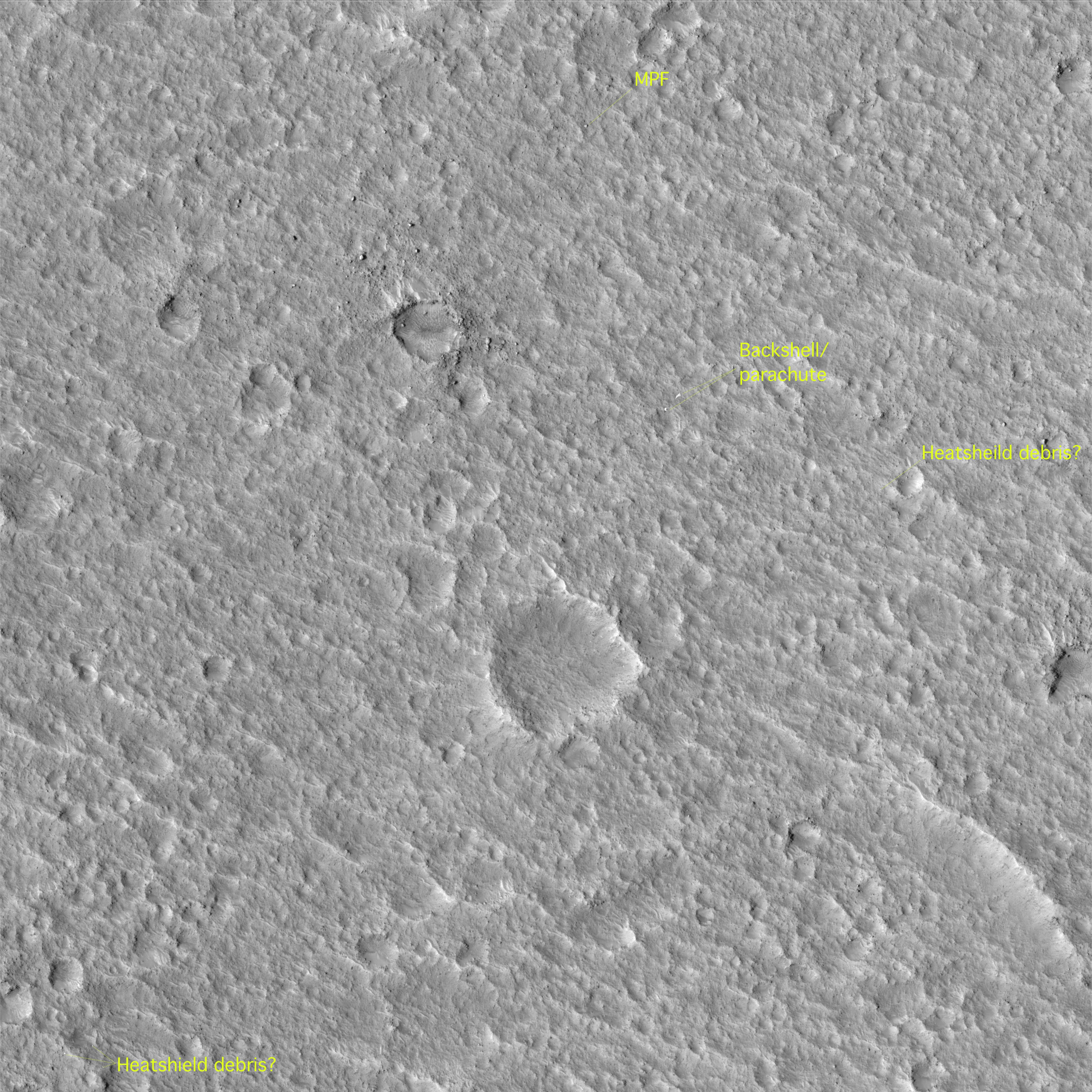
Mars Pathfinder seen from space by the MRO HiRISE
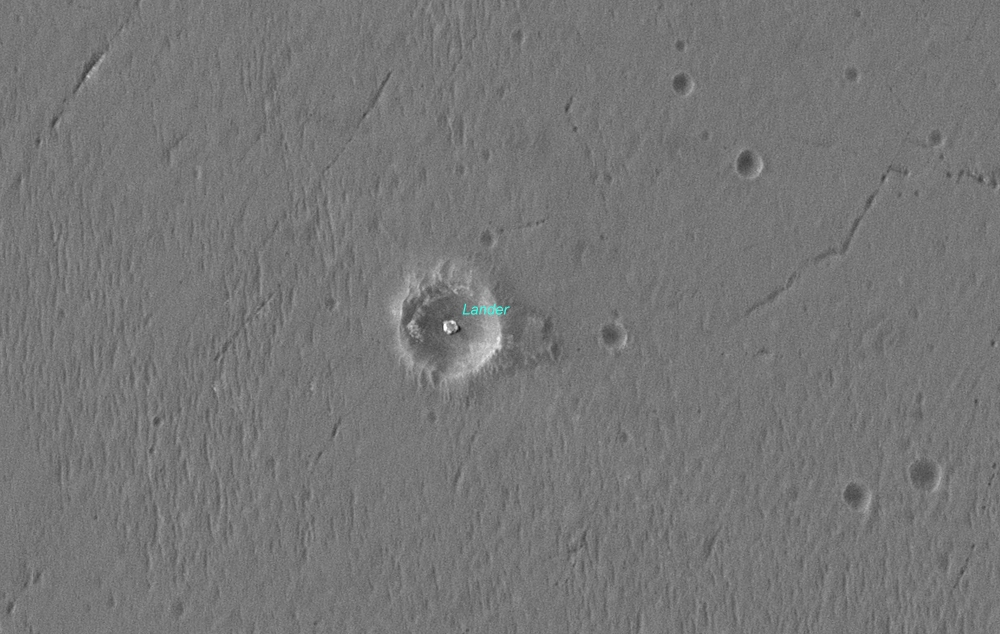
MER-B Opportunity lander in Eagle crater (2006)

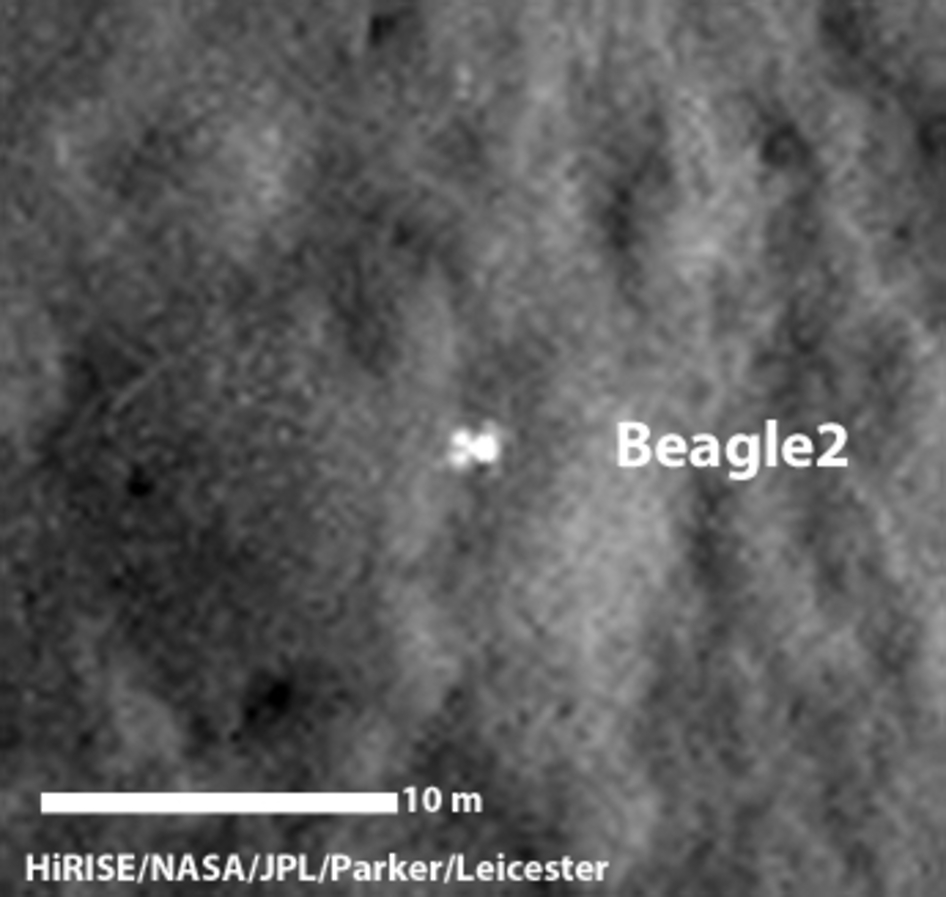
Beagle 2, after 11 years found and showing that it made it to the surface but did not expand fully to transmit

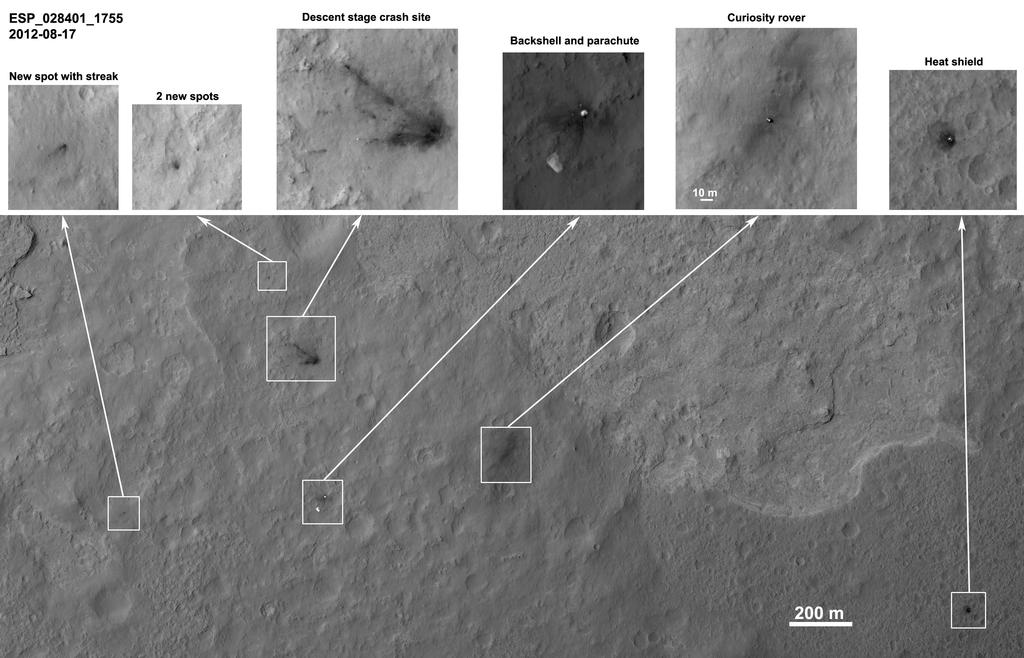
Curiosity landing remnants

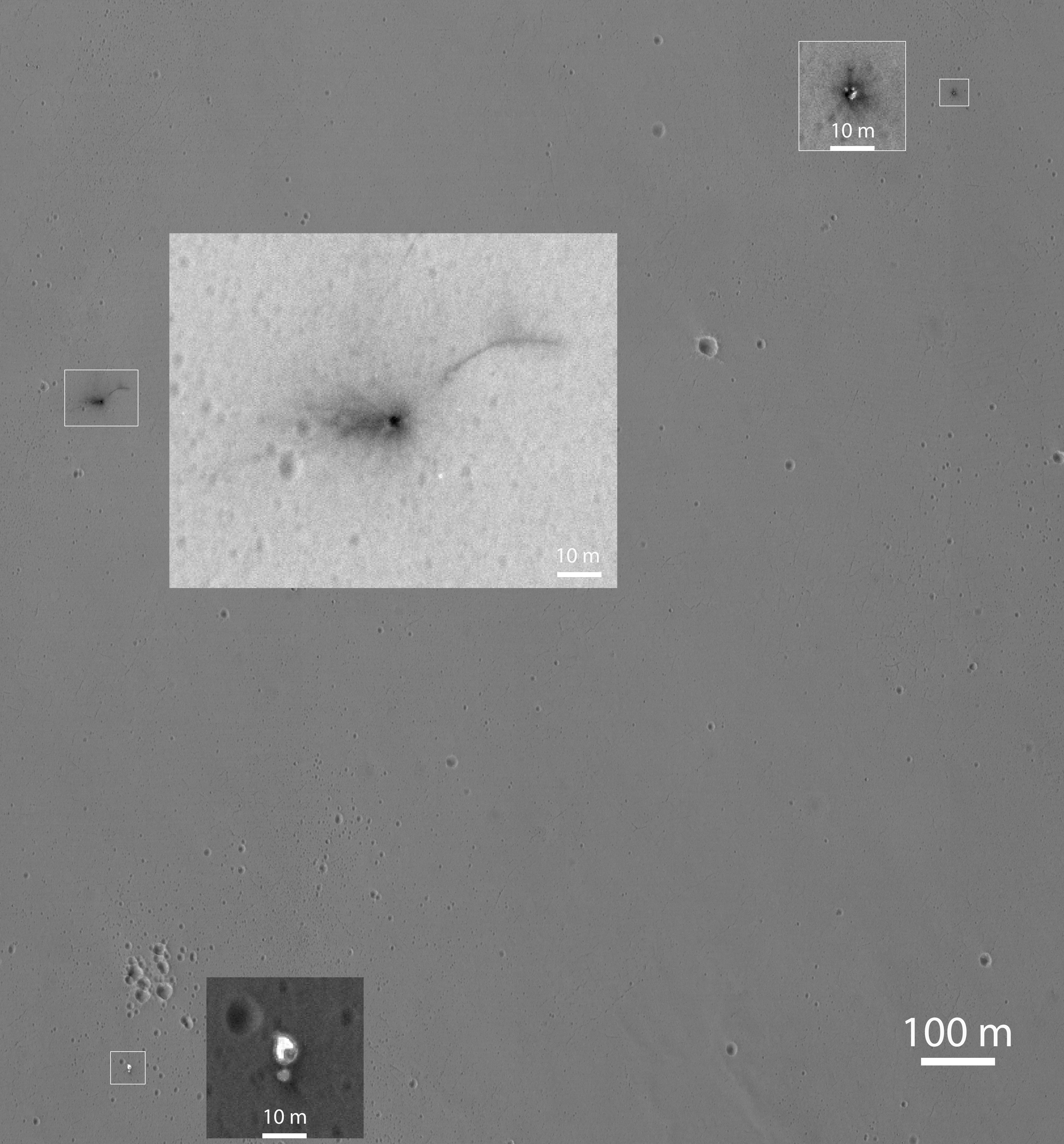
Schiaparelli remnants (2016)

== Landing site namings and memorials ==
Several landing sites have been named, either the spacecraft itself or the landing site:

- Pennants of Soviet Union on Mars 2 and Mars 3 landers (1971).
- Thomas Mutch Memorial Station, the Viking 1 lander (1976).
- Gerald Soffen Memorial Station, the Viking 2 lander (1976).
- Carl Sagan Memorial Station, Mars Pathfinder (Sojourner) base (1997).
- Challenger Memorial Station, MER-B (Opportunity) landing site area (2004).
- Columbia Memorial Station, MER-A (Spirit) landing site area (2004).
- Green Valley, the Phoenix lander (2008).
- Bradbury Landing, Curiosity rover landing site (August 6, 2012). (Note: Due to the nature of the landing system, there is no actual space hardware at the touchdown location of Bradbury Landing, see Curiosity (rover))
- InSight Landing, the InSight lander (2018)
- Octavia E. Butler Landing, Perseverance rover and Ingenuity helicopter landing site (February 18, 2021)
- Wright Brothers Field, the initial take-off and landing site for the Ingenuity helicopter, used for five flights (April, May 2021)
- Three Forks Sample Depot, backup sample Depot of Perseverance cached samples for return to Earth by NASA-ESA Mars Sample Return Mission (2022)

== See also ==
- Exploration of Mars
- Life on Mars
- List of artificial objects on extra-terrestrial surfaces
- List of extraterrestrial memorials
- List of missions to Mars
- Satellites of Mars
- Timeline of planetary exploration
