= Mars 1M =

Series of two uncrewed Soviet spacecraft

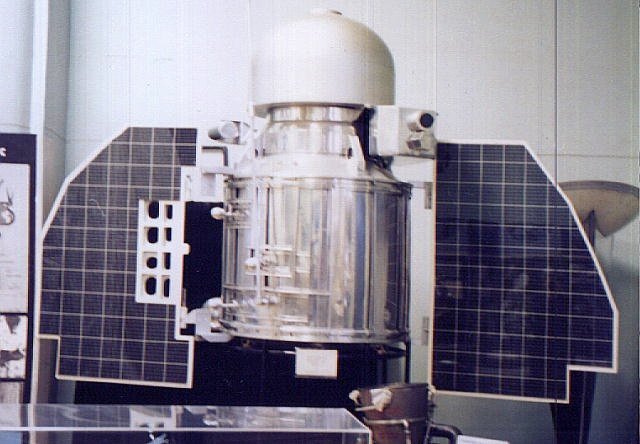
Mars 1M spacecraft

Mars 1M was a series of two uncrewed spacecraft which were used in the first Soviet missions to explore Mars. They were the earliest missions of the Mars program. The Western media dubbed the spacecraft "Marsnik", a portmanteau of Mars and Sputnik.

== Spacecraft ==
Mars 1M No.1, known in the West as Marsnik 1, Mars 1960A and Korabl 4, was destroyed in a launch failure on October 10, 1960. In 1962, NASA Administrator James E. Webb informed the United States Congress that NASA believed the mission was an attempt at a Mars flyby probe. Some Soviet scientists involved with the program at that time claim no knowledge of this mission, stating that only the second launch was an intended Mars mission. However, V. G. Perminov, the leading designer of planetary spacecraft at the Lavochkin design bureau, states that this mission was indeed intended for Mars and was identical to the later mission.

Mars 1M No.2, known in the West as Marsnik 2, Korabl 5 and Mars 1960B, was launched on October 14, 1960.

Both Mars 1M spacecraft were launched by Molniya rockets. The unproven third stage malfunctioned on both flights as cavitation in the fuel lines prevented the engines from developing adequate thrust, and, as a result, neither spacecraft achieved its initial geocentric parking orbit. Mars 1M No.2 reached an altitude of 120 km before reentry.

Soviet premier Nikita Khrushchev had planned to bring models of the Mars probes for showcasing at his visit to the UN that month, but as both launches failed, they remained packed.

== Mission profile ==
The objectives of the mission were to investigate interplanetary space between Earth and Mars, to study Mars and return surface images from a flyby trajectory, and to study the effects of extended spaceflight on onboard instruments and provide radio communications from long distances.

== Spacecraft and subsystems ==
NASA describes the spacecraft as:

nearly identical to the Venera 1 design, a cylindrical body about 2 meters high with two solar panel wings, a 2.33 meter high-gain net antenna, and a long antenna arm, and had a mass of about 650 kg. It carried a 10 kg science payload consisting of a magnetometer on a boom, cosmic ray counter, plasma-ion trap, a radiometer, a micrometeorite detector, and a spectroreflectometer to study the CH band, a possible indicator of life on Mars. These instruments were mounted on the outside of the spacecraft. A photo-television camera was held in a sealed module in the spacecraft and could take pictures through a viewport when a sensor indicated the Sun-illuminated martian surface was in view. Attitude was controlled by a Sun-star sensor with attitude correction performed by a dimethylhydrazine/nitric acid bipropellant rocket engine. The spacecraft orientation was to be maintained so that the solar panels faced the Sun throughout the flight. Power was provided by the two-square meter solar panels which charged silver-zinc batteries. Radio communications were made using a decimeter band transmitter via the high gain antenna for spacecraft commands and telemetry. Radio bearing was used to maintain the antennas' orientation to Earth. Images were to be transferred using an 8-cm wavelength transmitter through the high-gain antenna. A fourth stage was added to the booster, the Molniya (rocket) or 8K78, the new launcher was designated SL-6/A-2-e.
