= List of Mars landers =

The following table is a list of successful and unsuccessful Mars landers. As of 2022, 21 lander missions and 8 sub-landers (Rovers and Penetrators) attempted to land on Mars. Of 21 landers, the Curiosity rover and Perseverance rover are currently in operation on Mars.

== Mars landers ==
List of Mars landers
| S.No | Landers | Launch date | Landing date | Mass (kg) | Landing site | Region | Status | Country | MOLA | Entry velocity | References |
|---|---|---|---|---|---|---|---|---|---|---|---|
| 1. | Mars 2MV-3 No.1 | 04 Nov 1962 | 25 Nov 1962 | 890 | - | - | Failure | USSR | - | - | |
| 2. | Mars 2 | 19 May 1971 | 27 Nov 1971 | 1210 | 45°S 47°E^{♦} | - | Failure | USSR | - | - | |
| 3. | Mars 3 | 28 May 1971 | 02 Dec 1971 | 1210 | 45°S 202°E^{♦} | Sirenum Terra | Partial success | USSR | - | 5.7 km/sec | |
| 4. | Mars 6 | 05 Aug 1973 | 12 Mar 1974 | 635 | 23.90°S 19.4°W | Margaritifer Terra | Failure | USSR | - | - | |
| 5. | Mars 7 | 09 Aug 1973 | - | 635 | - | - | Failure | USSR | - | - | |
| 6. | Viking 1 | 20 Aug 1975 | 20 Jul 1976 | 572 | 22.27°N 47.95°W | Chryse Planitia | Success | USA | -3.5 | 4.61 km/sec | |
| 7. | Viking 2 | 09 Sep 1975 | 03 Sep 1976 | 572 | 47.64°N 225.71°W | Utopia Planitia | Success | USA | -3.5 | 4.61 km/sec | |
| 8. | Phobos 1^{§} | 07 Jul 1988 | - | 2600^{†} | - | - | Failure | USSR | - | - | |
| 9. | Phobos 2^{§} | 12 Jul 1988 | - | 2600^{†} | - | - | Failure | USSR | - | - | |
| 10. | Mars 96 | 16 Nov 1996 | - | 3159 | - | - | Failure | Russia | - | - | |
| 11. | Mars Pathfinder | 04 Dec 1996 | 04 Jul 1997 | 361 | 19°7′48″ N 33°18′12″W | Ares Vallis | Success | USA | -2.5 | 7.26 km/sec | |
| 12. | Mars Polar Lander | 03 Jan 1999 | 03 Dec 1999 | 583 | 76°S 195°W | Ultimi Scopuli | Failure | USA | -3.0 | 6.91 km/sec | |
| 13. | Beagle 2 | 02 Jun 2003 | 25 Dec 2003 | 33.2 | 11.5265°N 90.4295°E | Isidis Planitia | Failure | United Kingdom | - | 5.63 km/sec | |
| 14. | Spirit rover | 10 Jun 2003 | 4 Jan 2004 | 174 | 14.5684°S 175.4726°E | Gusev Crater | Success | USA | -1.9 | 5.4 km/sec | |
| 15. | Opportunity rover | 07 Jul 2003 | 25 Jan 2004 | 174 | 1.9462°S 354.4743°E | Meridiani Planum | Success | USA | -1.4 | 5.5 km/sec | |
| 16. | Phoenix lander | 04 Aug 2007 | 25 May 2008 | 350 | 68.22°N 125.7°W | Vastitas Borealis | Success | USA | -3.5 | 5.59 km/sec | |
| 17. | Curiosity rover | 26 Nov 2011 | 6 Aug 2012 | 899 | 4.5895°S 137.4417°E | Gale Crater | Operational | USA | 2.0 | 5.6 km/sec | |
| 18. | Schiaparelli EDM | 14 Mar 2016 | 19 Oct 2016 | 577 | 2.052°S 6.208°W | Meridiani Planum | Failure | (European Union) ESA/Russia | 1.45 | 5.83 km/sec | |
| 19. | InSight Mars Lander | 5 May 2018 | 26 Nov 2018 | 727 | 4.5°N 135.9°E | Elysium Planitia | Success | USA | -2.5 | 6.3 km/sec | |
| 20. | Perseverance rover | 30 Jul 2020 | 18 Feb 2021 | 1,025 | 18.4447°N 77.4508°E | Jezero crater | Operational | USA | - | - | |
| 21. | Tianwen-1 | 23 Jul 2020 | 14 May 2021 | 240 | 25.1°N, 109.7°E | Utopia Planitia | Success | China | - | 4.8 km/sec | |

^{§} - Spacecraft intended for Martian moons (Phobos and Deimos), ^{†}Entry Mass, ^{♦} Estimated, MOLA - Mars Orbiter Laser Altimeter

List of sub-landers onboard Mars landers
| S.No | Sub-Landers | Type | Lander Slot | Launch Date | Mass (kg) | Status | References |
|---|---|---|---|---|---|---|---|
| 1. | PrOP-M | Rover | Mars 2 | 19 May 1971 | 4.5 | Failure | |
| 2. | PrOP-M | Rover | Mars 3 | 28 May 1971 | 4.5 | Not deployed | |
| 3. | Mars 96 | Penetrator | Mars 96 | 16 Nov 1996 | 88 | Failure | |
| 4. | Deep Space 2 | Penetrator | Mars Polar Lander | 03 Jan 1999 | 2.4 | Failure | |
| 5. | Sojourner | Rover | Mars Pathfinder | 04 Dec 1996 | 11.5 | Success | |
| 6. | Mars helicopter Ingenuity | UAV Helicopter | Mars 2020 Perseverance rover | 30 Jul 2021 | 1.8 | Success | |
| 7. | Zhurong | Rover | Tianwen-1 | 23 Jul 2021 | 240 | Success | |
| 8. | Tianwen-1 Remote camera | Camera | Zhurong rover | 1 June 2021 | <1 | Success | |

== Future and proposed Mars lander missions ==
List of future proposed Mars lander missions
| Lander | Planned Launch | Country | Agency | Type | Sub-Lander | Status | References |
|---|---|---|---|---|---|---|---|
| Martian Moons Exploration^{§} | 2026 | Japan | JAXA | Lander | Sample Return | Planned | |
| Tianwen 3 | 2028 | China | CNSA | Lander | Ascent Stage, drone | Planned | |
| Rosalind Franklin | 2028 | Europe | ESA | Lander | Rover | Planned | |
| Skyfall | 2028 | US | NASA | Helicopters | | Planned | |
| Mars Lander Mission | 2030 | India | ISRO | Lander | Rover, helicopter | Planned | |
| Mars Lander | 2045 | South Korea | KARI | Lander | | Planned | |
| Mars MetNet Precursor | ? | Finland | FMI | Impact Lander | | Not implemented | |
| Mars MetNet | ? | Finland | FMI | Multi-lander | | Not implemented | |
| BOLD | 2020 | US | NASA | Impact Lander | 6-Impact Lander | Not implemented | |
| Phootprint | 2024 | Europe | ESA | Lander | Ascent Stage | Not implemented | |
| Fobos-Grunt (Repeat) | 2024 | Russia | Roscosmos | Lander | Ascent Stage | Not implemented | |
| Mars-Grunt | 2024 | Russia | Roscosmos | Lander | | Not implemented | |
| Icebreaker | 2026 | US | NASA | Lander | | Not implemented | |
| Sample Retrieval Lander | 2028 | US | NASA | Lander | Ascent Stage | Cancelled | |

== See also ==
- List of artificial objects on Mars
- Lists of spacecraft
