= Mars 2MV-3 No.1 =

Soviet Mars spacecraft

2MV-3 No.1
- Mission type: Mars lander
- Harvard designation: 1962 Beta Xi 1
- COSPAR ID: 1962-062A
- SATCAT no.: 00451

Spacecraft properties
- Spacecraft type: 2MV-3
- Manufacturer: OKB-1
- Launch mass: 890 kilograms (1,960 lb)

Start of mission
- Launch date: 4 November 1962, 15:35:15 UTC
- Rocket: Molniya 8K78 s/n T103-17
- Launch site: Baikonur 1/5

End of mission
- Decay date: 25 November 1962

Orbital parameters
- Reference system: Geocentric
- Regime: Low Earth (achieved); Heliocentric (intended)

Mars 2MV-3 No.1 also known as Sputnik 24 in the West, was a Soviet spacecraft, which was launched in 1962 as part of the Mars program, and was intended to land on the surface of Mars. Due to a problem with the rocket which launched it, it did not depart low Earth orbit, and it decayed several days later. It was the only Mars 2MV-3 spacecraft to be launched.

== Launch ==
The spacecraft was launched at 15:35:15 UTC on 4 November 1962, atop a Molniya 8K78 carrier rocket flying from Site 1/5 at the Baikonur Cosmodrome. About 260 seconds into the flight, the oxidiser pressurisation system malfunctioned, resulting in cavitation within the feed lines and turbopump. The same problem developed in the propellant feed lines thirty-two seconds later. Although the lower stages of the rocket were still able to place the upper stage and payload into a low Earth orbit, vibrations caused by either the cavitation problem, or a separate problem with the next stage, caused a fuse to become dislodged in the electrical system controlling the upper stage engine. This prevented the Blok L upper stage igniting, leaving the spacecraft in its parking orbit. It decayed from orbit the next day. However, some debris remained in orbit until 27 December, and the upper stage ullage motor platform remained in orbit until 19 January 1963.

== Designation ==
The designations Sputnik 31, and later Sputnik 24, were used by the United States Naval Space Command to identify the spacecraft in its Satellite Situation Summary documents, since the Soviet Union did not release the internal designations of its spacecraft at that time, and had not assigned it an official name due to its failure to depart geocentric orbit.

== See also ==
- List of missions to Mars
