= Naval Space Command =

Former command of the U.S. Navy

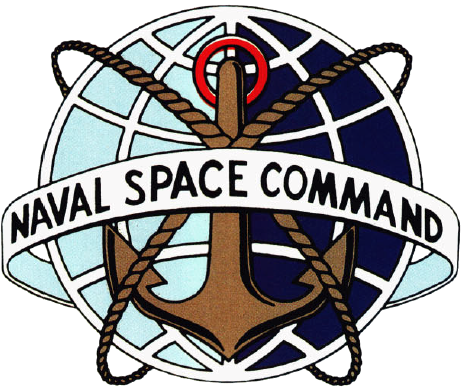
- Naval Space Command emblem
- Founded: 1 October 1985
- Disbanded: July 2002
- Country: United States
- Branch: United States Navy
- Type: Space command
- Part of: United States Space Command
- Headquarters: Dahlgren, Virginia

The Naval Space Command (NSC) was a military command of the United States Navy and former component command of United States Space Command. It was headquartered at Dahlgren, Virginia, and began operations on 1 October 1985. Naval Space Command used space capabilities to support naval forces through the operation of reconnaissance and communications satellites, as well as representing the Navy's space interests, both within the Navy and within U.S. Space Command.

The command was merged into Naval Network and Space Operations Command, itself part of Naval Network Warfare Command, about July 2002.

== History ==
In the late 1950s the United States Naval Research Laboratory's Project Vanguard Minitrack system used electronic signals emitted by Sputnik and other satellites to characterize their orbits, serving as one of the first methods of ground-based satellite tracking. This system would become commissioned in 1961 as the Naval Space Surveillance System, and in 1993 the system would be transferred to Naval Space Command. Three transmitter sites in the network were located at Jordan Lake, Alabama, Lake Kickapoo, Texas, and Gila River, Arizona, while six receiver sites were located at Tattnall County, Georgia, Hawkinsville, Georgia, Silver Lake, Mississippi, Red River, Arkansas, Elephant Butte, New Mexico, and San Diego, California.

In 1987 the Naval Space Command was given the responsibility for operating the Alternate Space Operations Center for U.S. Space Command. Additionally, NSC had responsibility for operating U.S. Space Command's space surveillance networks, as well as providing space intelligence support to naval forces.

While officially disestablished in 2002, in 2004 significant components of Naval Space Command were transferred to Air Force Space Command's 20th Space Control Squadron (now the 20th Space Surveillance Squadron of the United States Space Force). These components include the former Naval Space Surveillance System (renamed the Air Force Space Surveillance System) and the responsibility for operating the Alternate Space Operations Center.

== See also ==
- Naval Information Warfare Systems Command
- Navy Space Command
