= Mariner Mars '71 =

Mariner Mars '71 can refer to two American spaceprobes:

- Mariner 8
- Mariner 9
