= Phobos program =

1988 Soviet missions to Mars

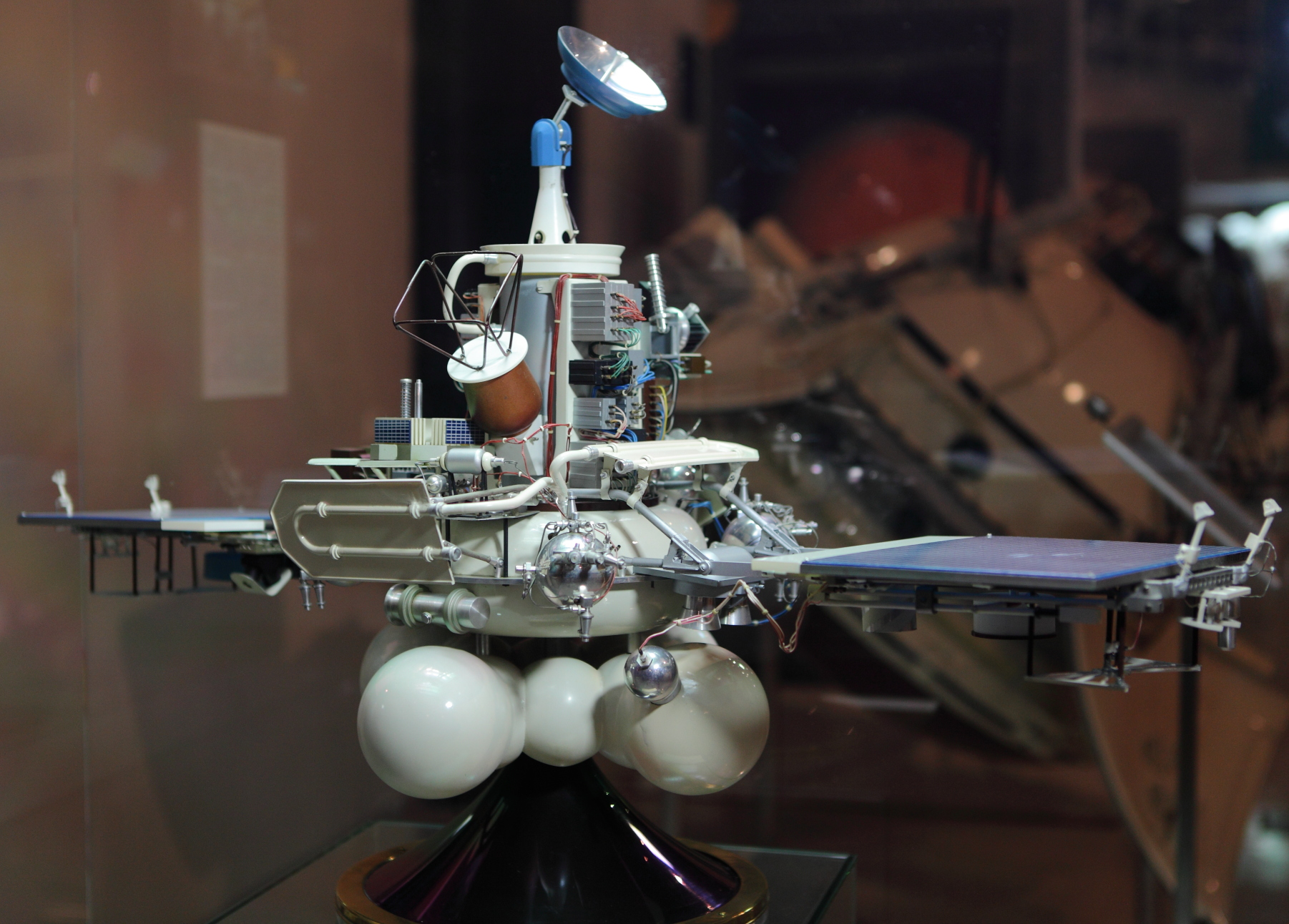
Phobos probe model

The Phobos program (Russian: Фобос, Fobos) was an uncrewed space mission consisting of two probes launched by the Soviet Union to study Mars and its moon Phobos. Phobos 1 was launched on 7 July 1988, and Phobos 2 on 12 July 1988.

Phobos 1 suffered a terminal failure en route to Mars. Phobos 2 attained Mars orbit and made several passes collecting data on the Martian system, but contact was lost before the final phase, prior to deployment of the planned Phobos landers.

Phobos 1 and 2 were of a new spacecraft design, the 1F, succeeding the 4MV type used in the Venera planetary missions of 1975–1985, and the 5VK design last used during the Vega 1 and Vega 2 missions to Comet Halley. They each had a mass of 2600 kg (6220 kg with orbital insertion hardware attached), and were launched aboard a Proton-K rocket.

The program featured cooperation from 14 other nations, including Sweden, Switzerland, Austria, France, West Germany, Czechoslovakia, and the United States (which contributed the use of its NASA Deep Space Network for tracking the twin spacecraft).

== Objectives ==
The objectives of the Phobos missions were to:

- conduct studies of the interplanetary environment;
- perform observations of the Sun;
- characterize the plasma environment in the Martian vicinity;
- conduct surface and atmospheric studies of Mars; and,
- study the surface composition of the Martian satellite Phobos.

== Spacecraft design ==
The main section of the spacecraft consisted of a pressurized toroidal electronics section, surrounding a modular cylindrical experiment section. Below these were mounted four spherical tanks (the Fregat stage) containing hydrazine for attitude control and, after the main propulsion module was to be jettisoned, orbit adjustment. A total of 28 thrusters (twenty-four 50 N thrusters and four 10 N thrusters) were mounted on the spherical tanks, with additional thrusters mounted on the spacecraft body and solar panels. Attitude was maintained through the use of a three-axis control system, with pointing maintained with Sun and star sensors.

== Phobos 1 ==
Phobos 1 operated nominally until, a few weeks into the cruise to Mars, an expected communications session on September 2, 1988, failed to occur. The failure of controllers to regain contact with the spacecraft was traced to an error in the software uploaded on August 29/August 30, which had deactivated the attitude thrusters. By losing its lock on the Sun, the spacecraft could no longer properly orient its solar arrays, thus depleting its batteries.

Software instructions to turn off the probe's attitude control, normally a fatal operation, were part of a routine used when testing the spacecraft on the ground. Normally this routine would be removed before launch. However, the software was coded in PROMs, and so removing the test code would have required removing and replacing the entire computer. Because of time pressure from the impending launch, engineers decided to leave the command sequence in, though it should never be used. However, a single-character error in constructing an upload sequence resulted in the command executing, with subsequent loss of the spacecraft.

== Phobos 2 ==
Sample image taken by the Phobos 2 probe. Enhanced image released by the IKI. Taken 430 km away with a resolution of 80/420 m.

Phobos 2 was launched atop a Proton-K with a Blok D upper stage from Baikonur cosmodrome on July 12, 1988, and entered Mars orbit on January 29, 1989. Phobos 2 operated nominally throughout its cruise and Mars orbital insertion phases on January 29, 1989, gathering data on the Sun, the interplanetary medium, Mars, and Phobos. Phobos 2 investigated Mars's surface and atmosphere and returned 37 images of Phobos with a resolution of up to 40 meters. Communications were lost before planned deployment of a Phobos lander.

== Systems and sensors ==
Phobos probes carried several instruments: solar x-ray and ultraviolet telescopes, a neutron spectrometer and the Grunt radar experiment designed to study the surface relief of Phobos. The lander had an x-ray/alpha spectrometer to provide information on the chemical element composition of the surface of Phobos, a seismometer to determine the internal structure of Phobos, and the "Razrez" penetrator with temperature sensors and an accelerometer for testing the physical and mechanical properties of the surface.

The Phobos 2 infrared spectrometer (ISM) obtained 45000 spectra in the near infrared (from 0.75 to 3.2 μm) in the equatorial areas of Mars, with a spatial resolution ranging from 7 to 25 km, and 400 spectra of Phobos at 700 m resolution. These observations made it possible to retrieve the first mineralogical maps of the planet and its satellite, and to study the atmosphere of Mars. ISM was developed at IAS and DESPA (Paris Observatory) with support from CNES.

List of instruments:

- "VSK" TV imaging system
- PROP-F "hopping" lander. Only carried by Phobos 2.
  - ARS-FP automatic X-ray fluorescence spectrometer
  - ferroprobe magnetometer
  - Kappameter magnetic permeability / susceptibility sensor
  - gravimeter
  - temperature sensors
  - BISIN conductometer / tiltmeter
  - mechanical sensors (penetrometer, UIU accelerometer, sensors on hopping mechanism)
- "DAS" (long-lived autonomous station) lander
  - TV camera
  - ALPHA-X Alpha-Proton-X-Ray Spectrometer
  - LIBRATION Sun sensor (also known as STENOPEE)
  - Seismometer
  - RAZREZ anchor penetrometer
  - Celestial mechanics experiment
- "ISM" thermal infrared spectrometer/radiometer - 1–2 km resolution
- near-infrared imaging spectrometer
- thermal imaging camera; magnetometers
- gamma-ray spectrometers
- X-ray telescope
- radiation detectors
- radar and laser altimeters
- Lima-D laser experiment - designed to vaporise material from the Phobos surface for chemical analysis by a mass spectrometer
- Automatic Space Plasma Experiment with Rotating Analyzer (ASPERA), an electron spectrometer and ion mass analyser from the Swedish Institute of Space Physics.
- "Grunt" imaging radar - Only carried by Phobos 1

== See also ==
- Exploration of Mars
- List of missions to Mars
- Space exploration
