= Phobos 1 =

Soviet mars probe

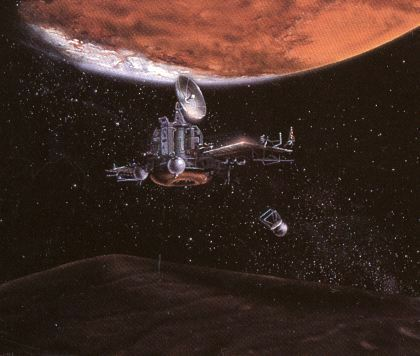
- Illustration of the Phobos 1 spacecraft
- Operator: IKI
- COSPAR ID: 1988-058A
- SATCAT no.: 19281
- Website: Phobos Mission

Spacecraft properties
- Launch mass: 6,220 kg (13,710 lb)

Start of mission
- Launch date: 17:38:04, 7 July 1988 (UTC)
- Rocket: Proton-K 8K82K/D-1
- Launch site: Baikonur Site 200/40

Orbital parameters
- Reference system: Areocentric
- Epoch: planned

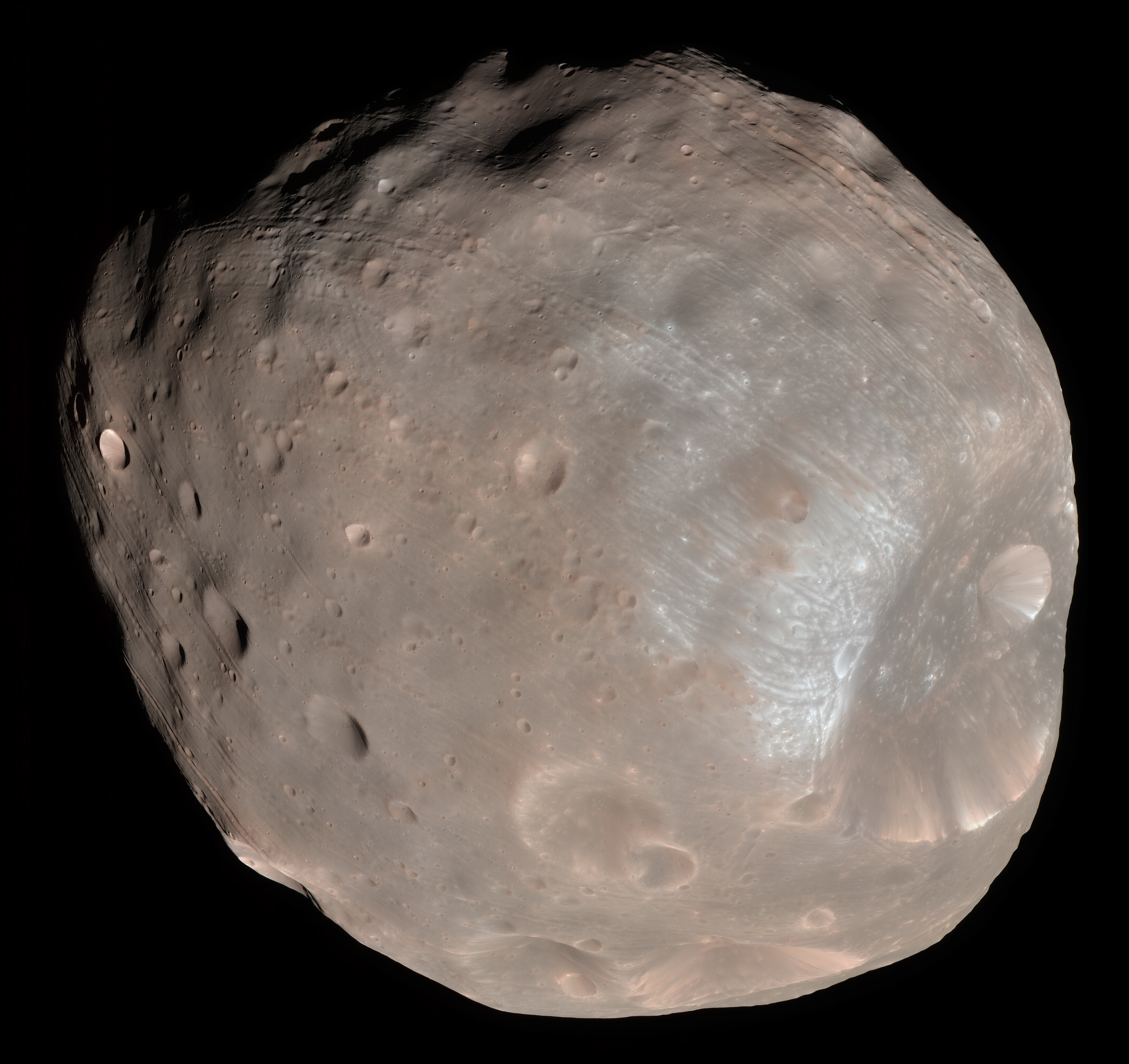
Phobos was the primary object of study for the Phobos 1 spacecraft.

Phobos 1 was a failed uncrewed Soviet space probe of the Phobos Program, intended to explore Mars and its moon Phobos, launched in July 1988. The Phobos 1 probe failed on 28 August 1988 when a mistyped command deactivated crucial systems onboard the spacecraft. It was launched from Baikonur Cosmodrome aboard a Proton-K, with its twin probe Phobos 2. At 6,220 kg, they remained the heaviest interplanetary spacecraft until the 2011 Fobos-Grunt.

== Background ==
The intent to carry out a mission with Phobos as the target was first made public 14 November 1984. Phobos was chosen as the target in order to avoid directly competing with previous American missions. Originally a 1986 launch was planned but this later moved to 1988.

== Flight plan ==
It was to take an estimated 200 days for the Phobos 1 space probe to travel from the Earth to Mars. Two mid-course corrections were planned, the first between days 7 and 20, and the second between days 185 and 193. These corrections would place the probe in a highly elliptical orbit around Mars. Next, it was to move into an almost circular observation orbit at 350 km. After achieving observation orbit the lower stage of the propulsion system would be dropped. The probe would then rendezvous with Phobos, drop a lander containing scientific equipment from an altitude of 50 meters, and move into a final equatorial orbit above Mars where it would study the Martian surface and atmosphere.

== Mission objectives ==
The Phobos 1 probe's scientific study was separated into three phases. In stage one the probe would investigate the Sun and interplanetary space while traveling from the Earth to Mars. In stage two the probe would study Mars and Phobos while in orbit around Mars. During the final stage it would approach to within 50 meters of the Phobos surface while conducting several experiments.

== Experiments ==
The Phobos probe carried several scientific instruments. It carried a radar transmitter, X-ray and alpha-backscatter spectrometers, camera, and a laser that could vaporize tiny spots so a reflector could analyze the vapor for atomic masses.

The probe also carried a hopper. The hopper would be dropped onto Phobos to drill and analyze the soil. It would be able to bounce across the terrain by using spring loaded legs.

== Mission profile ==
The optical coronagraph that was part of the Terek experiment and designed to observe the Sun was non-functional from launch.

=== Malfunction ===
On 2 September 1988, an expected transmission from Phobos 1 was not received. This was traced to a faulty key-command that was sent on 28 August from ground control in Yevpatoria. As with Mariner 1, a technician unintentionally left out a single hyphen in a keyed command. All commands were supposed to be proofread by a computer before transmission, but the computer that checked code was malfunctioning. A technician violated procedure and transmitted the command before the computer could be fixed to proofread it. This minor alteration in code deactivated the attitude thrusters. By losing its lock on the Sun, the spacecraft could no longer properly orient its solar arrays, thus depleting its batteries.

Software instructions to turn off the probe's attitude control, normally a fatal operation, were part of a routine used when testing the spacecraft on the ground. Normally this routine would be removed before launch. However, the software was coded in PROMs, and so removing the test code would have required removing and replacing the entire computer. Because of time pressure from the impending launch, engineers decided to leave the command sequence in, although it was never intended for use. However, a single-character error in constructing an upload sequence resulted in the command executing, with subsequent loss of the spacecraft.

The error is also attributed to a political argument between Yevpatoria and Moscow over who should control the mission. Moscow won control responsibility, but Yevpatoria would be responsible for checking all transmitted commands. This further complicated the process of transmitting valid commands to the spacecraft.

== Subsequent investigation ==
After the incident at Yevpatoria, an investigation was immediately ordered to determine who was responsible for the failure. Nevertheless, disciplinary action was postponed until the completion of the Phobos 2 mission. This was to prevent the demoralization of the Phobos 2 team. Any penalization of the Phobos 1 team would create anxiety among the Phobos 2 team and reduce the chances of mission success. This postponement of punitive measures was urged by IKI director Roald Sagdeev. He quoted the former secret-service chief under Stalin, Lavrenti Beria, who said, "Let's make them work for now. We can shoot them all later." The investigation concluded with the dismissal of the ground control commander at Yevpatoria and the acknowledgement that the computer system was poorly designed.

== Results ==
The probe observed the Sun in both X-rays (0.5–2.5 nm) and extreme ultraviolet (17–18 nm). On 27 August a solar flare was observed.

== Legacy ==
Phobos 1 failed before it could achieve its main scientific objectives, and while the Phobos program as a whole can be considered a failure, the probes discovered previously unknown information concerning Mars and Phobos during their lengthy orbital flights. In 1988, less was known about Mars and its satellites than the more distant gas giants.

== Speculation regarding ==
In 2026, a non-peer-reviewed preprint hypothesised that the near-Earth asteroid 1998 KY_{26} could be the Phobos 1. The presprint's authors have stated that their research did not unequivocally identify 1998 KY_{26} asPhobos 1. 1998 KY_{26} is still assumed to be a natural body by the scientific community.

== See also ==
- List of software bugs
