= Metre per hour =

Unit of measurement

Metre per hour (American spelling: meter per hour) is a metric unit of both speed (scalar) and velocity (Vector (geometry)). Its symbol is m/h or m·h^{−1} (not to be confused with the imperial unit symbol mph). By definition, an object travelling at a speed of 1 m/h for an hour would move 1 metre.

The term is rarely used however as the units of metres per second and kilometres per hour are considered sufficient for the majority of circumstances. Metres per hour can however be convenient for documenting extremely slow moving objects. A Garden Snail for instance, typically moves at a speed of up to 47 metres per hour.

== Conversions ==
- 3,600 m/h ≡ 1 m·s^{−1}, the SI derived unit of speed, metre per second
- 1 m/h ≈ 0.00027778 m/s
- 1 m/h ≈ 0.00062137 mph ≈ 0.00091134 feet per second

== How to convert ==
- To convert from kilometers per hour to meters per hour, multiply the figure by 1,000 (hence the prefix kilo- from the ancient Greek language word for thousand).
- To convert from meters per second to meters per hour, divide the figure by 3,600 (that is 60 * 60, i.e. 60 seconds for each of the 60 minutes).

== See also ==
- Orders of magnitude (speed)
