= Phobos 2 =

Soviet Mars moon probe (1988–1989)

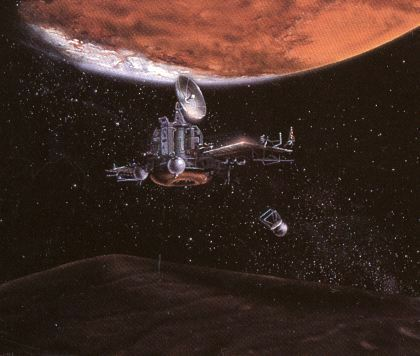
- Illustration of the Phobos spacecraft
- Mission type: Orbiter
- Operator: Soviet Union
- COSPAR ID: 1988-059A
- SATCAT no.: 19287
- Website: www.iki.rssi.ru/IPL/phobos.html
- Mission duration: 8 months, 15 days (launch until comm failure)

Spacecraft properties
- Launch mass: 6,220 kg (with orbital insertion hardware)

Start of mission
- Launch date: 17:01:43, 12 July 1988 (UTC)
- Rocket: Proton-K rocket

End of mission
- Last contact: 27 March 1989 (spacecraft signal failed to be reacquired).

Orbital parameters
- Reference system: Areocentric

Mars orbiter
- Orbital insertion: 29 January 1989

Phobos 2 was the last space probe designed by the Soviet Union. It was designed to explore the moons of Mars, Phobos and Deimos. It was launched on 12 July 1988, and entered orbit on 29 January 1989.

Phobos 2 operated nominally throughout its cruise and Mars orbital insertion phase on 29 January 1989, gathering data on the Sun, interplanetary medium, Mars, and Phobos. Phobos 2 investigated the Mars surface and atmosphere and returned 37 images of Phobos with a resolution of up to 40 meters.

Shortly before the final phase of the mission, during which the spacecraft was to approach within 50 m of Phobos's surface and release two landers (one, a mobile hopper, the other, a stationary platform) contact with Phobos 2 was lost. The mission ended when the spacecraft signal failed to be reacquired on 27 March 1989. The cause of the failure was determined to be a malfunction of the on-board computer, and subsequent loss of orientation and power.

== Background ==
The mission to Phobos was announced on 14 November 1984. Phobos was chosen as the target in order to avoid direct competition with previous American missions. The original 1986 launch plan was later moved to 1988.

== Mission profile ==
Phobos 2 started to develop problems during the interplanetary flight phase of the mission. By the time the probe reached Mars orbit, two of its three computers were malfunctioning. One computer was completely dead, and a second was starting to fail. Since the probe depended on two computers to agree on any decision, the one healthy computer would not be able to control the craft because it could not outvote two bad computers. The craft's high speed transmitter had also developed issues.

Phobos 2 successfully carried out three preliminary encounters with Phobos by using its Videospectrometric Camera, the Combined Radiometer and Photometer for Mars and the Imaging Spectrometer for Mars.

== Spacecraft design ==
=== Instruments ===
The Phobos 2 infrared spectrometer (ISM) obtained 45000 spectra in the near infrared (from 0.75 to 3.2 μm) in the equatorial areas of Mars, with a spatial resolution ranging from 7 to 25 km, and 400 spectra of Phobos at 700 m resolution. These observations made it possible to generate the first mineralogical maps of the planet and its satellite, and to study the atmosphere of Mars. ISM was developed at IAS and DESPA (Paris Observatory) with support from CNES.

List of instruments:

- "VSK" TV imaging system
- PROP-F "hopping" lander.
  - ARS-FP automatic X-ray fluorescence spectrometer
  - ferroprobe magnetometer
  - Kappameter magnetic permeability / susceptibility sensor
  - gravimeter
  - temperature sensors
  - BISIN conductometer / tiltmeter
  - mechanical sensors (penetrometer, UIU accelerometer, sensors on hopping mechanism)
- "DAS" (long-lived autonomous station) lander
  - TV camera
  - ALPHA-X Alpha-Proton-X-Ray Spectrometer
  - LIBRATION Sun sensor (also known as STENOPEE)
  - Seismometer
  - RAZREZ anchor penetrometer
  - Celestial mechanics experiment
- "ISM" thermal infrared spectrometer/radiometer – 1±2 km resolution
- near-infrared imaging spectrometer
- thermal imaging camera; magnetometers
- gamma-ray spectrometers
- X-ray telescope
- radiation detectors
- radar and laser altimeters
- Lima-D laser experiment – designed to vaporize material from the Phobos surface for chemical analysis by a mass spectrometer
- Automatic Space Plasma Experiment with Rotating Analyzer (ASPERA), an electron spectrometer and ion mass analyzer from the Swedish Institute of Space Physics.

== Results ==
The craft took 37 photos of Phobos imaging the majority (80%) of the moon. The infrared spectrometer found no sign of water.

== Legacy ==
The Phobos design was used again for the long delayed Mars 96 mission which ended in failure when the launch vehicle's fourth stage misfired. In addition, the Fobos-Grunt mission, also designed to explore Phobos, failed in 2011. There has yet to be a completely successful probe to Phobos.
