= List of interplanetary voyages =

This is a comprehensive list of interplanetary spaceflights, spaceflight between two or more bodies of the Solar System, listed in chronological order by launch date. It includes only flights that escaped Earth orbit and reached the vicinity of another planet, asteroid, or comet. Flights that were planned but not executed, were destroyed at or shortly after launch, or missed their target entirely are not included. Flights which reached, but failed to return useful scientific data regarding their target, are given a gray background.

The list is divided between flights that stopped at a destination, and those that flew by their target.

== Overview ==
The lists below encompass 66 completed flights: 21 to Venus, 27 to Mars, 4 to Jupiter, 11 to minor planets, 1 to Saturn and 2 to Mercury.

Additionally there have been 85 passing interplanetary flights: 19 past Venus, 15 past Mars, 8 past Jupiter, 3 past Saturn, 1 past Neptune, 1 past Uranus, 3 past Mercury, 35 past minor planets.

== Completed flights ==
The following flights were completed by matching velocity with the target object, whether by station-keeping, entering orbit, landing, or impact.

=== 1960s ===
Spacecraft	Destination	Date and launch site	Reached planet	Flight duration	Notes	Ref
Venera 3	Venus	16 November 1965; Molniya M Baikonur 31/6	1 March 1966 impact	106 days (3 mo, 14 d)	Venera 3 was intended to soft-land on Venus. Contact with the spacecraft was lost before arrival, and Venera 3 crashed.	
Venera 4	Venus	12 June 1967; Molniya 8K78M; Baikonur 1/5	18 October 1967 entered atmosphere	129 days (4 mo, 7 d)	Venera 4, a Venus atmosphere probe, continued to transmit to an altitude of 25 km	
Venera 5	Venus	5 January 1969; Molniya 8K78M; Baikonur 1/5	16 May 1969 entered atmosphere	132 days (4 mo, 12 d)	Venera 5 was a Venus atmosphere probe.	
Venera 6	Venus	10 January 1969; Molniya 8K78M; Baikonur 1/5	17 May 1969 entered atmosphere	128 days (4 mo, 8 d)	Venera 6 was a Venus atmosphere probe.	

=== 1970s ===
Spacecraft	Destination	Launch date	Reached planet	Flight duration	Notes	Ref
Venera 7 lander	Venus	17 August 1970	15 December 1970 landed	121 days (3 mo, 29 d)	Venera 7 made the first successful landing on another planet, and returned signals from the surface of Venus for 23 minutes.	
Mars 2 Orbiter and Lander	Mars	19 May 1971	27 November 1971 impact	193 days (6 mo, 9 d)	The Mars 2 lander crashed into Mars on 27 November 1971, in a failed soft landing attempt. It was the first manmade object to reach the surface of Mars. The orbiter continued operating until 22 August 1972.	
Mars 3 Orbiter and Lander	Mars	28 May 1971	2 December 1971 entered orbit/landed	189 days (6 mo, 5 d)	Mars 3 did not attain its intended orbit due to insufficient fuel. The lander reached the surface on 2 December 1971, but contact was lost immediately afterward. The orbiter continued operating until 22 August 1972.	
Mariner 9 Orbiter	Mars	30 May 1971	14 November 1971 entered orbit	169 days (5 mo, 16 d)	Mariner 9 was the first spacecraft to orbit another planet. It remained active until 27 October 1972.	
Venera 8 lander	Venus	27 March 1972	22 July 1972 landed	118 days (3 m, 26 d)	Venera 8 returned signals from the surface of Venus for 50 minutes.	
Mars 5 Orbiter	Mars	25 July 1973	12 February 1974 entered orbit	203 days (6 mo, 19 d)	Mars 5 collected images and other data from Mars for 22 days.	
Mars 6 Lander	Mars	5 August 1973	12 March 1974 impact	220 days (7 mo, 8 d)	Mars 6 crash-landed on Mars and contact with the craft was lost.	
Venera 9 orbiter and lander	Venus	8 June 1975	20 October 1975 entered orbit 22 October 1975 landed	135 days (4 mo, 13 d)	The Venera 9 lander transmitted the first images from the surface of Venus.	
Venera 10 orbiter and lander	Venus	14 June 1975	23 October 1975 entered orbit 25 October 1975 landed	132 days (4 mo, 10 d)	Venera 10 successfully landed and sent back images from the surface of Venus.	
Viking 1 Orbiter and Lander	Mars	20 August 1975	19 June 1976 entered orbit 20 July 1976 landed	305 days (10 mo)	Viking 1 transmitted the first images from the surface of Mars. The Viking orbiter was active until 17 August 1980, the lander until 13 November 1982.	
Viking 2 Orbiter and Lander	Mars	9 September 1975	7 August 1976 entered orbit 3 September 1976 landed	334 days (10 mo, 30 d)	Viking 2 was the second craft to land on Mars. The Viking orbiter was active until 25 July 1978, the lander until 11 April 1980.	
Pioneer Venus Orbiter	Venus	20 May 1978	4 December 1978 entered orbit	199 days (6 mo, 15 d)	Pioneer Venus made radar and other observations of Venus. The orbiter operated until August 1992.	
Pioneer Venus Multiprobe	Venus	8 August 1978	9 December 1978 entered atmosphere	124 days (4 mo, 2 d)	The Pioneer Venus multiprobe included a "bus" and four atmospheric probes, one of which survived its impact with Venus and continued to transmit from the surface for over an hour.	
Venera 12 Lander	Venus	14 September 1978	21 December 1978 landed	99 days (3 mo, 8 d)	Venera 12 returned data for 110 minutes. Images were not returned.	
Venera 11 Lander	Venus	9 September 1978	25 December 1978 landed	107 days (3 mo, 16 d)	Venera 11 returned data for 95 minutes. Images were not returned.	

=== 1980s ===
Spacecraft	Destination	Launched	Reached planet	Flight duration	Notes	Ref
Venera 13 Lander	Venus	30 October 1981	1 March 1982 landed	123 days (4 months, 2 days)	Venera 13 survived on the surface of Venus for 127 minutes.	
Venera 14 Lander	Venus	4 November 1981	5 March 1982 landed	122 days (4 months, 2 days)	Venera 14 survived on the surface of Venus for 57 minutes.	
Venera 15 Orbiter	Venus	2 June 1983	10 October 1983 entered orbit	131 days (4 months, 9 days)	Venera 15 carried out radar mapping of Venus.	
Venera 16 Orbiter	Venus	7 June 1983	14 October 1983 entered orbit	130 days (4 months, 8 days)	Venera 16 carried out radar mapping of Venus.	
Vega 1 Lander and balloon	Venus	15 December 1984	11 June 1985 landed/deployed	179 days (5 months, 28 days)	Some of the Vega 1's instruments deployed prematurely, rendering them useless.	
Vega 2 Lander and balloon	Venus	21 December 1984	15 June 1985 landed/deployed	177 days (5 months, 26 days)		
Phobos 2 Orbiter and Lander	Mars and Phobos	12 July 1988	29 January 1989	202 days (6 months, 18 days)	Phobos 2 achieved Mars orbit, but contact was lost on 27 March 1989 shortly before Phobos approach phase and deployment of Phobos landers	
Magellan Orbiter	Venus	4 May 1989	10 August 1990 entered orbit	464 days (1 yr, 3 mo, 7 d)	Magellan carried out global radar mapping of Venus. Magellan's mission continued to 12 October 1994, when the craft burned up in Venus' atmosphere.	
Galileo orbiter and atmosphere probe	Jupiter	18 October 1989	7 December 1995 entered orbit	2242 days (6 yr, 1 mo, 20 d)	Flew by several of Jupiter's moons; impacted into Jupiter 21 September 2003.	

=== 1990s ===
Spacecraft	Destination	Launched	Reached planet	Flight duration	Notes	Ref
Mars Observer orbiter	Mars	25 September 1992	24 August 1993 entered orbit?	334 days (11 months)	Contact with Mars Observer was lost 21 August 1993, shortly before Mars orbit insertion. May not have attained Mars orbit.	
Near Earth Asteroid Rendezvous (NEAR)	Asteroid 433 Eros	17 February 1996	14 February 2000 entered orbit 12 February 2001 landed	1459 days (3 yr, 11 mo, 29 d)	The orbiter performed an improvised landing on Eros. Its mission ended 28 February 2001.	
Mars Global Surveyor orbiter	Mars	7 November 1996	11 September 1997 entered orbit	309 days (10 months, 5 days)	Contact lost after 5 November 2006.	
Mars Pathfinder lander and Sojourner rover	Mars	4 December 1996	4 July 1997 landed	213 days (7 months, 1 day)	Rover deployed 6 July 1997. Mission continued to 27 September 1997.	
Cassini orbiter and Huygens Titan lander	Saturn and Titan	15 October 1997	1 July 2004 entered orbit	2452 days (6 yr, 8 mo, 17 d)	Mission ended 15 September 2017. Saturn orbiter, performing repeated by-flights of Saturn's moons; also deployed the Huygens Titan lander, the first probe to land on a satellite of another planet.	
Cassini orbiter and Huygens Titan lander	Saturn and Titan	15 October 1997	14 January 2005; Huygens landed on Titan	2649 days (Huygens) (7 years, 3 months)	Mission ended 15 September 2017. Saturn orbiter, performing repeated by-flights of Saturn's moons; also deployed the Huygens Titan lander, the first probe to land on a satellite of another planet.	
Mars Climate Orbiter	Mars	11 December 1998	23 September 1999 entered atmosphere	287 days (9 months, 13 days)	Orbit insertion failed due to a navigational error, and Mars Climate Orbiter burned up in the Martian atmosphere.	
Mars Polar Lander with Deep Space 2 ground-penetrators "Amundsen" and "Scott"	Mars	3 January 1999	3 December 1999 entered atmosphere	335 days (11 months, 1 day)	Contact with Mars Polar Lander was lost just prior to entering the Martian atmosphere.	

=== 2000s ===
Spacecraft	Destination	Launched	Reached planet	Flight duration	Notes	Ref
Mars Odyssey orbiter	Mars	7 April 2001	24 October 2001 entered orbit	201 days (6 months, 18 days)	Continuing mission.	
Hayabusa and MINERVA	Asteroid 25143 Itokawa	9 May 2003	12 September 2005 matched velocity with Itokawa; 19 and 25 November 2005 landings	858 days (2 yr, 4 mo, 4 d)	The MINERVA hopper was lost on 12 November 2005. Hayabusa's return journey to Earth began in April 2007; the spacecraft returned to Earth 13 June 2010.	
Mars Express orbiter and Beagle 2 lander	Mars	2 June 2003	25 December 2003 entered orbit	207 days (6 months, 24 days)	Continuing mission. Contact with Beagle 2 was lost after entering Mars' atmosphere on 25 December 2003.	
MER-A Spirit rover	Mars	10 June 2003	4 January 2004 landed	209 days (6 months, 26 days)	Last contact on 22 March 2010.	
MER-B Opportunity rover	Mars	7 July 2003	25 January 2004 landed	203 days (6 months, 19 days)	Last contact on 10 June 2018	
Rosetta orbiter and Philae lander	Comet 67P/Churyumov-Gerasimenko	2 March 2004	6 August 2014 (Entered orbit); 12 November 2014 (Philae landed)	N/A	64 Hours data transmission. Lander reactivated for 85 seconds 13 June 2015. Controlled impact to end mission on 30 September 2016.	
MESSENGER	Mercury	3 August 2004	17 March 2011 entered orbit	2418 days (6 years, 7 months, 15 days)	First probe to orbit Mercury. Deorbited on 30 April 2015	
Deep Impact impactor	Comet 9P/Tempel	12 January 2005	4 July 2005 impacted Tempel	174 days (5 months, 23 days)	First probe to directly impact a comet.	
Mars Reconnaissance Orbiter	Mars	12 August 2005	10 March 2006 entered orbit	211 days (6 months, 27 days)	Continuing mission.	
Venus Express Orbiter	Venus	9 November 2005	11 April 2006 entered orbit	154 days (5 months, 3 days)	Continuing mission to study the atmosphere of Venus. Last contact 18 January 2015.	
Phoenix Lander	Mars	4 August 2007	25 May 2008 landed	296 days (9 months, 22 days)	Collected soil samples near Mars' north pole to elucidate the history of water on Mars. Mission concluded 10 November 2008.	
Dawn	Asteroid 4 Vesta	27 September 2007	16 July 2011 entered orbit	1388 days (3 years, 9 months, 19 days)	Departed Vesta for 1 Ceres 5 September 2012.	
Dawn	1 Ceres	27 September 2007	6 March 2015 entered orbit	2718 days (7 years, 5 months, 8 days)	Last contact 31 October 2018.	

=== 2010s ===
Spacecraft	Destination	Launched	Reached planet	Flight duration	Notes	Ref
Akatsuki	Venus	20 May 2010	7 December 2015 entered orbit	N/A	Entered orbit five years after failed orbit insertion on 7 December 2010. Continuing mission to study the atmosphere of Venus.	
Juno	Jupiter	5 August 2011	4 July 2016 entered orbit	1,795 days (4 y, 10 m, 29 d)	First solar-powered Jupiter orbiter, mission to study Jupiter's interior and magnetic environment.	
Mars Science Laboratory (Curiosity - Rover)	Mars	26 November 2011	6 August 2012 landed	253 days (8 m, 10 d) 14h 15m 57s	900 kg mobile lander	
Mars Orbiter Mission (Mangalyaan)	Mars	5 November 2013	Reached Mars orbit on 24 September 2014			
MAVEN	Mars	18 November 2013	Reached Mars orbit on 22 September 2014			
Hayabusa2 with MINERVA-II rovers and MASCOT lander	Asteroid 162173 Ryugu	3 December 2014	27 June 2018 matched velocity with Ryugu; 21 February 2019 landing			
ExoMars Trace Gas Orbiter (TGO)/ Schiaparelli lander	Mars	14 March 2016	19 October 2016		Schiaparelli failed to land. TGO is still active to this date.	
OSIRIS-REx	101955 Bennu	8 September 2016	3 December 2018		Orbiter and Sample Return.	
InSight	Mars	5 May 2018	26 November 2018 landed		Robotic lander	
BepiColombo	Mercury	20 October 2018	5 December 2025	2604 days (7 yr, 1 mo, 16 d)	Dual satellite mission.	

=== 2020s ===
Spacecraft	Destination	Launched	Closest approach	Time elapsed	Notes	Ref
Emirates Mars Mission	Mars	19 July 2020	9 February 2021 in orbit		Orbiter	
Tianwen-1	Mars	23 July 2020	10 February 2021 landed		Robotic orbiter, deployable and remote cameras, lander, rover	
Mars 2020	Mars	30 July 2020	18 February 2021 landed		Robotic rover and helicopter	
Double Asteroid Redirection Test (DART)	Dimorphos	24 November 2021	26 November 2022 impacted		Impactor spacecraft that crashed into the minor-planet moon Dimorphos, deployed flyby cubesat LICIACube 15 days before.	
Jupiter Icy Moons Explorer (JUICE)	Jupiter	14 April 2023	July 2031 (planned)		Orbiter	
Psyche	Asteroid 16 Psyche	13 October 2023	August 2029 (planned)		Orbiter	
Hera, Milani and Juventas	Didymos	7 October 2024	December 2026 (planned)		Orbiter	
Europa Clipper	Jupiter	14 October 2024	11 April 2030 (planned)		Orbiter	
Tianwen-2	Asteroid 469219 Kamoʻoalewa	28 May 2025	7 June 2026	375 days (1 yr, 10 d)	Asteroid study and sample return	
Tianwen-2	Comet 311P/PanSTARRS	28 May 2025	January 2035 (planned)			

== Passing flights ==
The following flights flew by the target object at close range, but did not match velocity with their target or continued to another destination.

=== 1960s ===
Spacecraft	Destination	Launch date	Closest approach	Time elapsed	Notes	Ref
Venera 1	Venus	12 February 1961	19 May 1961	97 days (3 months, 8 days)	Contact with Venera 1 was lost 7 days after launch. It was the first spacecraft to fly by Venus, or indeed any planet.	
Mariner 2	Venus	27 August 1962	14 December 1962	110 days (3 months, 18 days)	Mariner 2 flew by Venus at a minimum distance of 34,773 km. It was the first spacecraft to return data from Venus.	
Mars 1	Mars	1 November 1962	19 June 1963	231 days (7 months, 19 days)	Mars 1 flew within approx. 193,000 km of Mars. Contact with it was lost on 21 March 1963.	
Zond 1	Venus	2 April 1964	14 July? 1964	104 days (3 months, 13 days)	Zond 1 was intended as a Venus lander. Contact with it was lost en route.	
Mariner 4	Mars	28 November 1964	15 July 1965	230 days (7 months, 18 days)	Mariner 4 returned the first close-up images of Mars.	
Zond 2	Mars	30 November 1964	6 August 1965	250 days (8 months, 8 days)	Zond 2 flew within 1,500 km of Mars. Contact with it was lost en route.	
Venera 2	Venus	12 November 1965	27 February 1966	108 days (3 months, 16 days)	Venera 2 flew by Venus at a distance of 24,000 km, but ceased to operate en route.	
Mariner 5	Venus	14 June 1967	19 October 1967	128 days (4 months, 6 days)	Mariner 5 flew by Venus at a minimum distance of 5,000 km.	
Mariner 6	Mars	25 February 1969	31 July 1969	156 days (5 months, 6 days)	Mariner 6 flew by Mars.	
Mariner 7	Mars	27 March 1969	5 August 1969	131 days (4 months, 9 days)	Mariner 7 flew by Mars.	

=== 1970s ===
Spacecraft	Destination	Launched	Closest approach	Time elapsed	Notes	Ref
Pioneer 10	Jupiter	3 March 1972	3 December 1973	641 days (1 yr, 9 mos, 1 d)	Pioneer 10 was the first spacecraft to fly by Jupiter.	
Pioneer 11	Jupiter	6 April 1973	4 December 1974	608 days (1 yr, 7 mo, 29 d)	Pioneer 11 flew by Jupiter.	
Pioneer 11	Saturn	6 April 1973	1 September 1979	2340 days (6 yr, 4 mo, 27 d)	Pioneer 11 was the first spacecraft to fly by Saturn.	
Mars 4	Mars	21 July 1973	10 February 1974	205 days (6 months, 21 days)	Mars 4 failed to enter Mars orbit and flew by it instead.	
Mars 6	Mars	5 August 1973	12 March 1974	220 days (7 months, 8 days)	The Mars 6 bus flew by Mars at a minimum distance of 1600 km. Also carried a lander.	
Mars 7	Mars	9 August 1973	9 March 1974	213 days (7 months, 1 day)	Mars 7's lander was released prematurely and missed Mars.	
Mariner 10	Venus	3 November 1973	5 February 1974	95 days (3 months, 3 days)	Mariner 10 flew by Venus at a minimum distance of 5768 km. It was the first use of a gravity assist by an interplanetary spacecraft.	
Mariner 10	Mercury	3 November 1973	29 March 1974	147 days (4 months, 27 days)	Mariner 10 flew by Mercury at a minimum distance of 704 km.	
Mariner 10	Mercury	3 November 1973	21 September 1974	323 days (10 months, 19 days)	Mariner 10 flew by Mercury at a minimum distance of 48,069 km.	
Mariner 10	Mercury	3 November 1973	16 March 1975	499 days (1 yr, 4 mo, 14 d)	Mariner 10 flew by Mercury at a minimum distance of 327 km.	
Voyager 2	Jupiter	20 August 1977	9 July 1979	689 days (1 yr, 10 mo, 20 d)	Voyager 2 flew by Jupiter.	
Voyager 2	Saturn	20 August 1977	5 August 1981	1447 days (3 yr, 11 mo, 17 d)	Voyager 2 flew by Saturn.	
Voyager 2	Uranus	20 August 1977	24 January 1986	3080 days (8 yr, 5 mo, 5 d)	Voyager 2 flew by Uranus and was the first spacecraft to visit it.	
Voyager 2	Neptune	20 August 1977	25 August 1989	4389 days (12 yr, 6 days)	Voyager 2 flew by Neptune and was the first spacecraft to visit it.	
Voyager 1	Jupiter	5 September 1977	5 March 1979	547 days (1 yr, 6 mo, 1 d)	Voyager 1 flew by Jupiter and returned the first detailed images.	
Voyager 1	Saturn	5 September 1977	12 November 1980	1165 days (3 yr, 2 mo, 8 d)	Voyager 1 flew by Saturn.	
ICE	Comet 21P/Giacobini-Zinner	12 August 1978	11 September 1985	2588 days (7 yr, 1 mo)	ICE flew by Giacobini-Zinner. ICE was previously the solar monitor ISEE3.	
ICE	Comet 1P/Halley	12 August 1978	28 March 1986	2786 days (7 yr, 7 mo, 17 d)	ICE flew by Halley at a minimum distance of 32 million km.	
Venera 11	Venus	9 September 1978	25 December 1978	108 days (3 months, 17 days)	The Venera 11 bus flew by Venus at a minimum distance of 34,000 km and left a lander.	
Venera 12	Venus	14 September 1978	19 December 1978	97 days (3 months, 6 days)	The Venera 12 bus flew by Venus at a minimum distance of 34,000 km and left a lander.	

=== 1980s ===
Spacecraft	Destination	Launched	Closest approach	Time elapsed	Notes	Ref
Venera 13	Venus	30 October 1981	1 March 1982	123 days (4 months, 2 days)	The Venera 13 bus flew by Venus and left a lander.	
Venera 14	Venus	4 November 1981	5 March 1982	122 days (4 months, 2 days)	The Venera 14 bus flew by Venus and left a lander.	
Vega 1	Venus	15 December 1984	11 June 1985	179 days (5 months, 28 days)	Vega 1 flew by Venus.	
Vega 1	Comet 1P/Halley	15 December 1984	6 March 1986	447 days (1 yr, 2 mo, 20 d)	Vega 1 flew by Halley at a minimum distance of 8,890 km.	
Vega 2	Venus	21 December 1984	15 June 1985	177 days (5 months, 26 days)	Vega 2 flew by Venus.	
Vega 2	Comet 1P/Halley	21 December 1984	9 March 1986	444 days (1 yr, 2 mo, 17 d)	Vega 2 flew by Halley at a minimum distance of 8,890 km.	
Sakigake	Comet 1P/Halley	7 January 1985	11 March 1986	429 days (1 yr, 2 mo, 5 d)	Sakigake flew by Halley at a minimum distance of 6.99 million km.	
Giotto	Comet 1P/Halley	2 July 1985	14 March 1986	256 days (8 months, 13 days)	Giotto flew by Halley at a minimum distance of 596 km.	
Giotto	Comet 26P/Grigg-Skjellerup	2 July 1985	10 July 1992	2566 days (7 yr, 9 d)	Giotto flew by Grigg-Skjellerup	
Suisei	Comet 1P/Halley	18 August 1985	8 March 1986	203 days (6 mo, 19 d)	Suisei flew by Halley at a minimum distance of 151,000 km.	
Galileo	Venus	18 October 1989	10 February 1990	116 days (3 months, 24 days)	Galileo flew by Venus at a minimum distance of 16,000 km as a gravity assist en route to Jupiter.	
Galileo	Asteroid 951 Gaspra	18 October 1989	29 October 1991	742 days (2 yr, 12 d)	Galileo flew by Gaspra at a minimum distance of 1900 km en route to Jupiter.	
Galileo	Asteroid 243 Ida	18 October 1989	28 August 1993	1411 days (3 yr, 10 mo, 11 d)	Galileo flew by Ida at a minimum distance of 2400 km en route to Jupiter. It discovered the first known asteroid moon, Dactyl.	

=== 1990s ===
Spacecraft	Destination	Launched	Closest approach	Time elapsed	Notes	Ref
Ulysses	Jupiter	6 October 1990	8 February 1992	491 days (1 yr, 4 mo, 3 d)	Ulysses flew by Jupiter for a gravity assist en route to solar polar observations	
Ulysses	Jupiter	6 October 1990	4 February 2004	4870 days (13 yr, 3 mo, 30 d)	Ulysses flew by Jupiter at a minimum distance of 0.8 AU.	
Near Earth Asteroid Rendezvous	Asteroid 253 Mathilde	17 February 1996	27 June 1997	497 days (1 yr, 4 mo, 11 d)	NEAR flew by Mathilde en route to Eros.	
Near Earth Asteroid Rendezvous	Asteroid 433 Eros	17 February 1996	23 December 1998	1041 days (2 yr, 10 mo, 7 d)	NEAR flew by Eros at a minimum distance of 3827 km after a failed attempt to enter orbit. NEAR attained orbit later (see Completed Flights).	
Cassini	Venus	15 October 1997	26 April 1998	194 days (6 months, 12 days)	Cassini flew by Venus for a first gravity assist en route to Saturn.	
Cassini	Venus	15 October 1997	24 June 1999	618 days (1 yr, 8 mo, 10 d)	Cassini flew by Venus for a second gravity assist en route to Saturn.	
Cassini	Asteroid 2685 Masursky	15 October 1997	23 January 2000	831 days (2 yr, 3 mo, 9 d)	Cassini flew by Masursky en route to Saturn.	
Cassini	Jupiter	15 October 1997	30 December 2000	1173 days (3 yr, 2 mo, 16 d)	Cassini flew by Jupiter for a gravity assist en route to Saturn.	
Nozomi	Mars	3 July 1998	14 December 2003	1991 days (5 yr, 5 mo, 12 d)	Nozomi failed to attain an orbit around Mars and flew by it instead.	
Deep Space 1	Asteroid 9969 Braille	24 October 1998	29 July 1999	279 days (9 months, 6 days)	Deep Space 1 flew by Braille. No close-up images were made due to a camera pointing error.	
Deep Space 1	Comet 19P/Borrelly	24 October 1998	22 September 2001	1065 days (2 yr, 10 mo, 30 d)	Deep Space 1 flew by Borrelly and returned images.	
Stardust	Asteroid 5535 Annefrank	7 February 1999	2 November 2002	1365 days (3 yr, 8 mo, 27 d)	Stardust flew by Annefrank	
Stardust	Comet 81P/Wild	7 February 1999	21 January 2004	1810 days (4 yr, 11 mo, 15 d)	Stardust flew a sample return mission by Wild.	
Stardust	Comet 9P/Tempel	7 February 1999	14 February 2011	N/A	Stardust flew by Tempel on an extended mission.	

=== 2000s ===
Spacecraft	Destination	Launched	Closest approach	Time elapsed	Notes	Ref
Rosetta	Mars	2 March 2004	25 February 2007	1091 days (2 yr, 11 mo, 24 d)	Rosetta flew by Mars as a gravity assist on the way to future encounters.	
Rosetta	Asteroid 2867 Šteins	2 March 2004	5 September 2008	1649 days (4 yr, 6 mo, 11 d)	Rosetta flew by Šteins.	
Rosetta	Asteroid 21 Lutetia	2 March 2004	10 July 2010	2322 days (6 yr, 4 mo, 9 d)	Rosetta flew by Lutetia en route to comet 67P/Churyumov-Gerasimenko.	
MESSENGER	Venus	3 August 2004	24 October 2006	813 days (2 yr, 2 mo, 22 d)	Messenger flew by Venus at a minimum distance of 2990 km. This was for a gravity assist only; no data was collected.	
MESSENGER	Venus	3 August 2004	6 June 2007	1038 days (2 yr, 10 mo, 4 d)	Messenger flew by Venus at a minimum distance of 300 km en route to Mercury.	
MESSENGER	Mercury	3 August 2004	14 January 2008	1260 days (3 yr, 5 mo, 12 d)	Messenger flew by Mercury a first time en route to Mercury orbit insertion.	
MESSENGER	Mercury	3 August 2004	29 September 2009	1884 days (5 yr, 1 mo, 27 d)	Messenger flew by Mercury a second time.	
Deep Impact	Comet 9P/Tempel	12 January 2005	3 July 2005	173 days (5 months, 22 days)	Deep Impact flew by Tempel.	
Deep Impact	Comet 103P/Hartley 2	12 January 2005	4 November 2010	2122 days (5 years, 9 months, 23 days)	Deep Impact flew by and imaged Hartley 2 as part of its extended mission.	
New Horizons	Asteroid 132524 APL	19 January 2006	13 June 2006	146 days (4 months, 26 days)	New Horizons flew by 132524 APL en route to Pluto.	
New Horizons	Jupiter	19 January 2006	28 February 2007	416 days (1 years, 1 months, 20 days)	New Horizons flew by Jupiter as a gravity assist en route to Pluto.	
New Horizons	Pluto	19 January 2006	14 July 2015	3318 days (9 years, 1 month, 1 day)	New Horizons flew by the Pluto system.	
New Horizons	486958 Arrokoth	19 January 2006	1 January 2019	4730 days (12 years, 11 months, 13 days)	First flyby of a small Kuiper Belt Object	
Dawn	Mars	27 September 2007	17 February 2009	509 days (1 yr, 4 mo, 21 d)	Dawn flew by Mars at a closest approach of 549 km for a gravity assist en route to the asteroids Vesta and Ceres	

=== 2010s ===
Spacecraft	Destination	Launch date	Closest approach	Time elapsed	Notes	Ref
Akatsuki	Venus	20 May 2010	7 December 2010	201 days (6 months, 17 days)	Attempted but failed to enter orbit; later entered orbit during a second attempt on 7 December 2015	
Chang'e 2	Asteroid 4179 Toutatis	1 October 2010	13 December 2012	804 days (2 years, 2 months, 12 days)		
PROCYON	Asteroid (185851) 2000 DP107	4 December 2014			Failed 3 December 2015, and thus never made the flyby.	
MarCO	Mars	5 May 2018	26 November 2018	206 days (6 mo, 22 d)	Provided communications support for the landing of InSight. Went silent in heliocentric orbit on 5 January 2019.	
Parker Solar Probe	Venus	12 August 2018	11 July 2020	700 days (1 yr, 11 mo)	Obtain direct solar observations. Not making observations during the Venus flybys.	
BepiColombo	Venus	20 October 2018	10 August 2021	1028 days (2 yr, 9 mo, 24 d)	Second of two Venus gravity assist en route to Mercury.	
BepiColombo	Mercury	20 October 2018	1 October 2021	1078 days (2 yr, 11 mo, 12 d)	First of six Mercury gravity assist en route to Mercury orbital insertion.	

=== 2020s ===
Spacecraft	Destination	Launch date	Closest approach	Time elapsed	Notes	Ref
LICIACube	Asteroid 65803 Didymos	24 November 2021	26 September 2022	307 days (10 mo, 7 d)	Separated from DART and took pictures of its impact with the asteroid.	
Lucy	Asteroid 152830 Dinkinesh	16 October 2021	1 November 2023	746 days (2 yr, 17 d)	Smallest main-belt asteroid explored by spacecraft yet. Discovered a natural satellite of the asteroid during the flyby.	
Lucy	Asteroid 52246 Donaldjohanson	16 October 2021	20 April 2025	1283 days (3 yr, 6 mo, 5 d)		
Lucy	Asteroid 3548 Eurybates	16 October 2021	12 August 2027 (planned)	4156 days (11 yr, 4 mo, 15 d)		
Lucy	Asteroid 15094 Polymele	16 October 2021	15 September 2027 (planned)	2161 days (5 yr, 11 mo)		
Lucy	Asteroid 11351 Leucus	16 October 2021	18 April 2028 (planned)	2377 days (6 yr, 6 mo, 3 d)		
Lucy	Asteroid 21900 Orus	16 October 2021	11 November 2028 (planned)	2584 days (7 yr, 27 d)		
Lucy	Asteroid 617 Patroclus	16 October 2021	2 March 2033 (planned)	2377 days (6 yr, 6 mo, 3 d)		
Psyche	Mars	13 October 2023	May 2026 (planned)		Mars gravity assist en route to the asteroid 16 Psyche	
Hera, Milani and Juventas	Mars	7 October 2024	March 2025 (planned)		Mars gravity assist en route to the asteroid system 65803 Didymos	
Europa Clipper	Mars	14 October 2024	1 March 2025 (planned)	138 days (4 mo, 18 d)	Mars gravity assist en route to Jupiter	

== See also ==
- List of missions to the outer planets
- List of extraterrestrial orbiters
- Human presence in space
