= 1983 Anchorage runway collision =

Aviation accident in 1983

1983 Anchorage runway collision Korean Air Lines Flight 084 · SouthCentral Air Flight 59
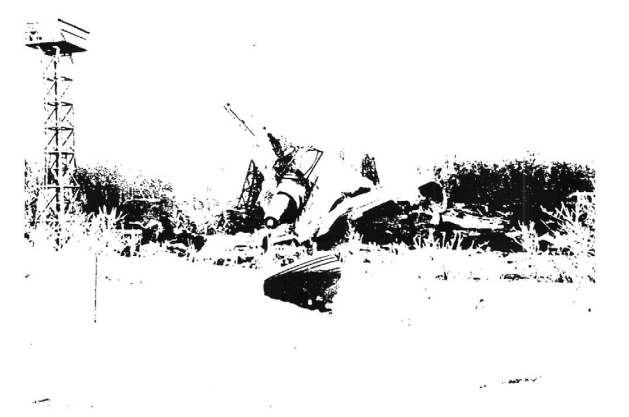
- Wreckage of Flight 084

Accident
- Date: 23 December 1983
- Summary: Collision on runway due to fog and disorientation of the pilot onboard Flight 084
- Site: Anchorage International Airport, Anchorage, Alaska; 61.1697°N 150.0062°W
- Total fatalities: 0
- Total injuries: 6
- Total survivors: 12

First aircraft
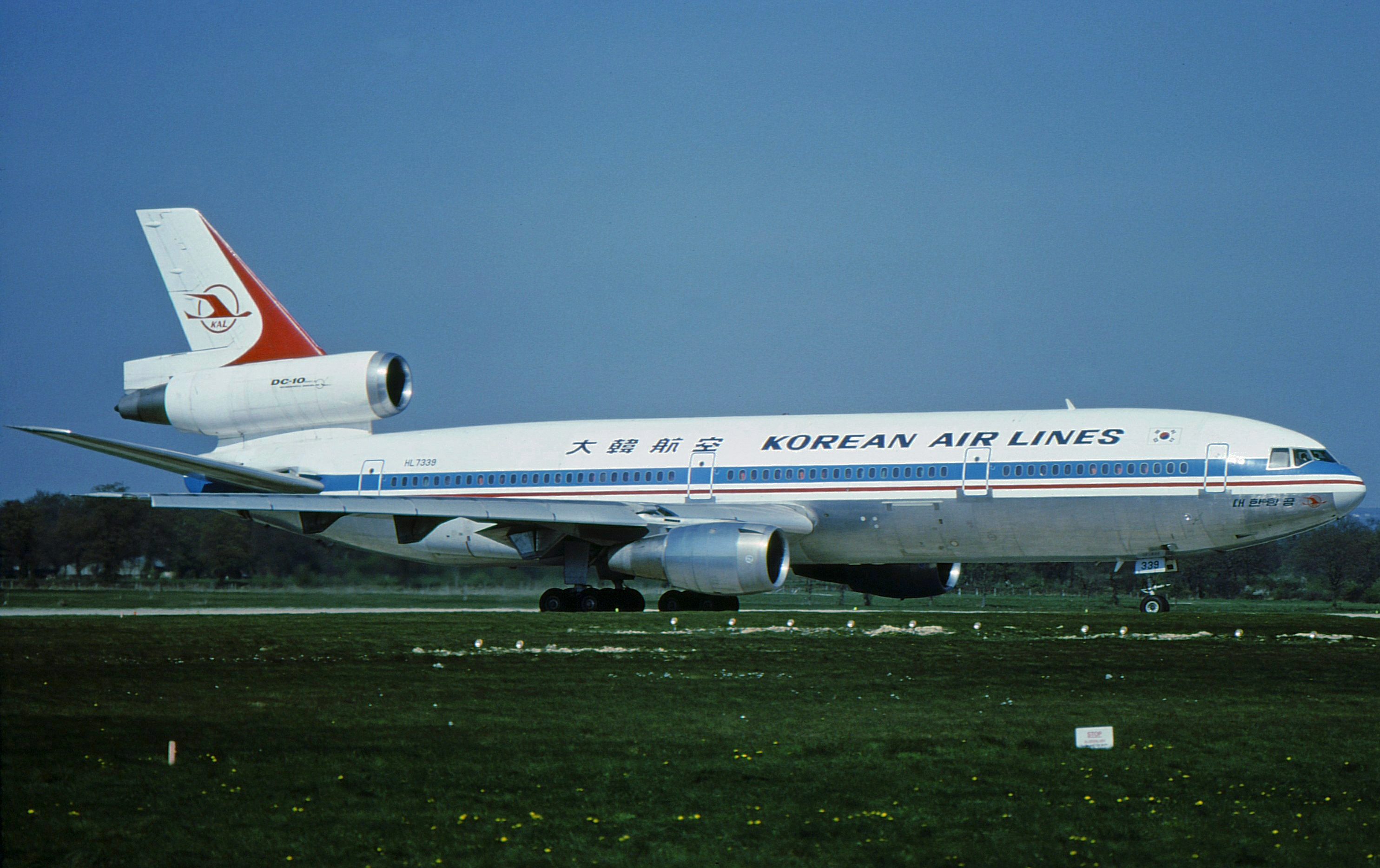
- HL7339, the McDonnell Douglas DC-10-30CF involved in the collision, photographed in 1981
- Type: McDonnell Douglas DC-10-30CF
- Operator: Korean Air Lines
- IATA flight No.: KE084
- ICAO flight No.: KAL084
- Call sign: KOREAN AIR 084
- Registration: HL7339
- Flight origin: Gimpo International Airport Seoul South Korea
- Stopover: Tokyo Haneda Airport Tokyo Japan
- 1st stopover: Ted Stevens Anchorage International Airport Anchorage Alaska
- Destination: Los Angeles International Airport, Los Angeles, California
- Occupants: 3
- Passengers: 0
- Crew: 3
- Fatalities: 0
- Injuries: 3
- Survivors: 3

Second aircraft
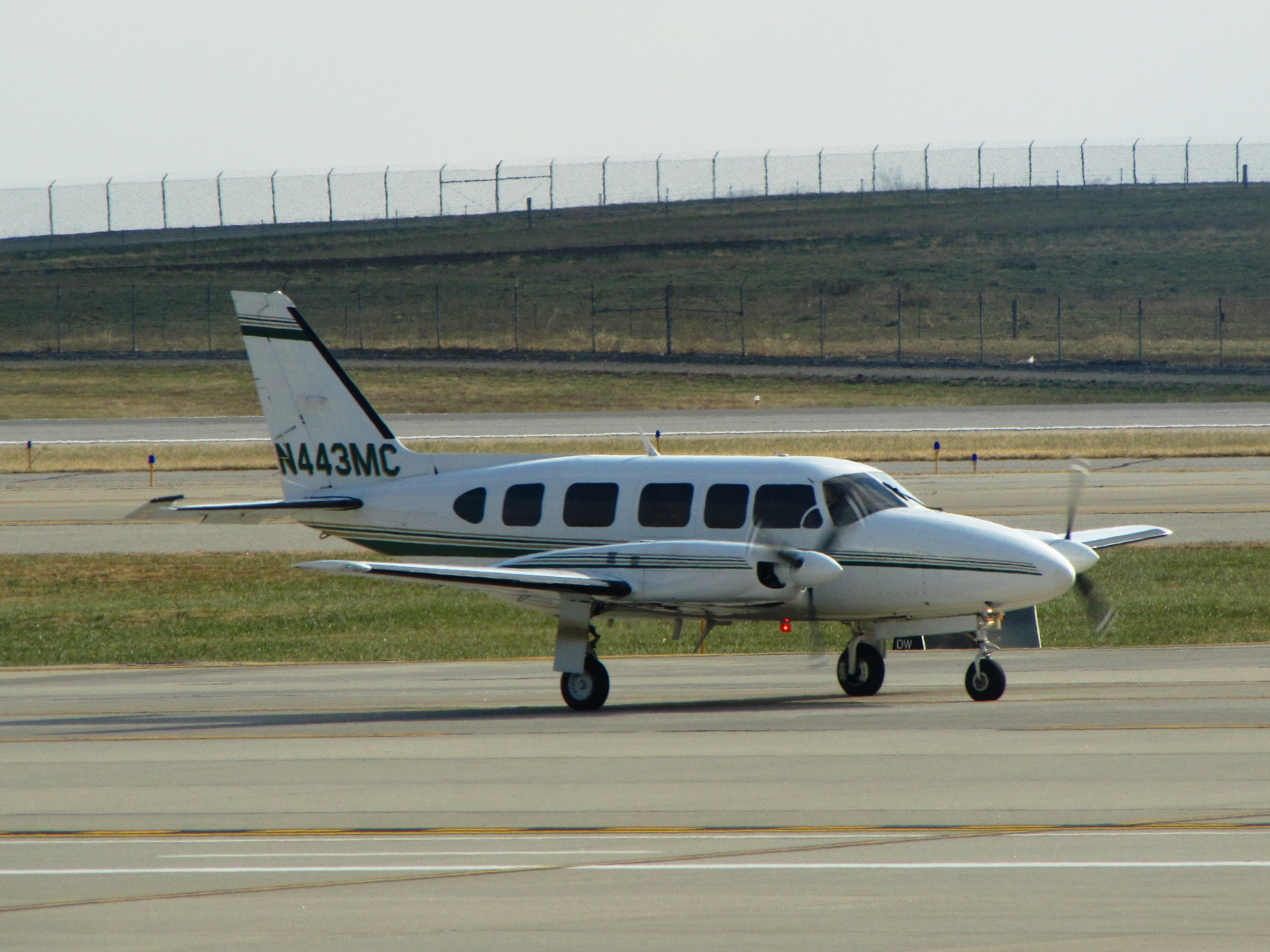
- A Piper PA-31-350 Navajo Chieftain, similar to the one involved in the collision
- Type: Piper PA-31-350 Navajo Chieftain
- Operator: SouthCentral Air
- IATA flight No.: XE59
- ICAO flight No.: SCA59
- Call sign: SOUTHCENTRAL 59
- Registration: N35206
- Flight origin: Anchorage International Airport, Anchorage, Alaska
- Destination: Kenai Municipal Airport, Kenai, Alaska
- Occupants: 9
- Passengers: 8
- Crew: 1
- Fatalities: 0
- Injuries: 3
- Survivors: 9

On 23 December 1983, Korean Air Lines Flight 084 (KAL084), a McDonnell Douglas DC-10-30CF performing a cargo flight, collided during its takeoff roll with SouthCentral Air Flight 59 (SCA59), a Piper PA-31-350, on runway 06L/24R (now 07L/25R) at Anchorage International Airport, as a result of the KAL084 flight crew becoming disoriented while taxiing in dense fog and attempting to take off on the wrong runway. Both aircraft were destroyed, but no fatalities resulted.

== Aircraft ==
The first aircraft involved was a McDonnell Douglas DC-10-30CF, MSN 46960, registered as HL7339, which was manufactured in 1977. The aircraft was equipped with three General Electric CF6-50C engines.

The second aircraft involved was a Piper PA-31-350 Chieftain, MSN 31-7952193, and registered as N35206.

== Accident ==
At 12:15 Yukon Standard Time, (Note: Alaska switched from four time zones to two on 30 October 1983, when the Yukon Time Zone (UTC−09:00 in winter and UTC−08:00 in summer), formerly used only in the city of Yakutat, was expanded to cover most of the state, including the city and airport of Anchorage. The Yukon Time Zone was renamed the Alaska Time Zone at the end of November 1983; see Time in Alaska for more information. The time in effect on the day of the accident would thus technically have been Alaska Standard Time; however, the NTSB report still uses the term "Yukon Standard Time".) Flight 59 was cleared from Anchorage to Kenai in accordance with its filed flight plan; however, clearance delivery told the pilot to expect a delay until 12:44 due to the heavy fog covering the airport, so the pilot shut down the aircraft and he and his passengers deplaned temporarily. After reboarding and recontacting the tower at 12:34, Flight 59 was delayed for about an hour at its parking location due to the continued dense fog, before finally requesting and receiving a taxi clearance around 13:39 as visibility began to improve. SCA 59 arrived at taxiway W-3 (which connects the main east–west taxiway to the approach end of runway 6L) at 13:44, holding short of runway 6L until the runway visual range (RVR) reached 1,800 ft (550 m), the minimum required for the flight to take off. (Note: At the time of the 1983 accident, the airport's three runways were numbered 6L/24R, 6R/24L, and 14/32. As of 2021, these are now numbered 7L/25R, 7R/25L, and 15/33, respectively, as the runways' magnetic headings are different from their 1983 values due to changes in Anchorage's magnetic declination over time resulting from shifts in the Earth's magnetic field.)

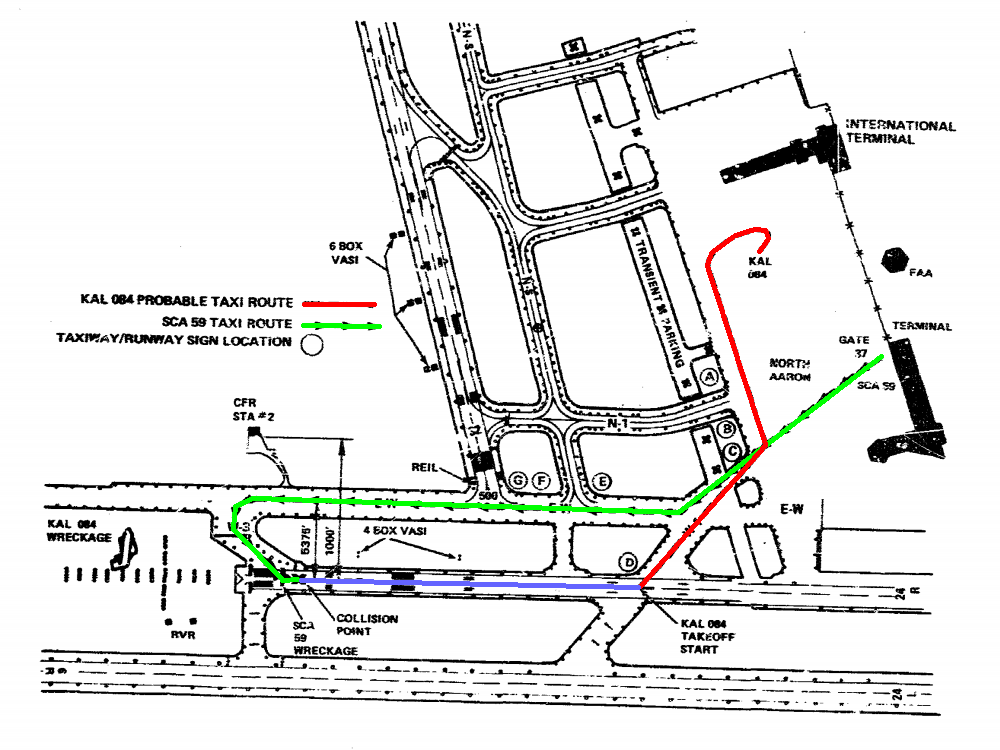
Taxi and takeoff routes of the accident aircraft. Flight 59's taxi route is in green; Flight 084's taxi route is in red and its takeoff roll is in blue. KAL084's proper taxi route would have followed the green path along the east–west taxiway until turning right onto runway 32 for takeoff.

At 13:57, the Anchorage ground controller cleared Korean Air Lines Flight 084 to taxi for a departure on either runway 6R or runway 32; the flight crew chose runway 32. The flight crew's selection of runway 32 was contrary to Korean Air Lines' operating specifications, as these required a visibility of at least one-quarter mile for takeoff on runway 32 at Anchorage, while the visibility at the time was only one-eighth of a mile. (Note: In contrast, a takeoff on runway 6R - the airport's primary instrument runway - would have required only that the transmissometers at the touchdown, midfield, and rollout zones of that runway were indicating an RVR of at least 600 feet; the runway 6R RVR was significantly better than this minimum, and, thus, KAL's operating specifications would have allowed a takeoff on this runway (but only on this runway).) (The National Transportation Safety Board [NTSB], which investigated the accident, was unable to determine why the flight crew chose runway 32 instead of runway 6R, in part because the aircraft's cockpit voice recorder (CVR) was never recovered.) The proper taxi route from the north apron (where the DC-10 was parked) to runway 32 would have involved taxiing south to the east–west taxiway, then making a right turn onto the east–west taxiway and following it to the threshold of runway 32 before turning right again onto the runway. However, the flight instead taxied southwest on taxiway W-1 to runway 6L/24R and lined up on the latter runway, facing west. The heavy fog prevented the ground controller from being able to see the flight's taxi route and impaired the KAL084 flight crew's ability to navigate around the airport; (Note: Other flightcrews that day had also experienced difficulty finding their way around in the fog. In a postaccident interview, the SCA 59 pilot recalled that, while he was taxiing to runway 6L, a Japan Airlines aircraft had started to pull into taxiway W-3 behind him, temporarily confusing it for taxiway W-4 (which connected the western ends of the east-west taxiway and runway 6R/24L), before realizing their mistake and continuing on down the east-west taxiway; in addition, airport safety personnel had had to assist in directing other aircraft that had become lost in the fog.) additionally, some of the lighted taxiway and runway designation signs along the flight's course were partially or fully burned out, making the signs less visually conspicuous and harder to see, and the intersections of taxiway W-1 with the east–west taxiway and with runway 6L/24R lacked signage to indicate the identity of either taxiway (the latter deficiency was rectified after the accident). The height above the ground of the DC-10's flight deck, about 30 ft (9.1 m), exacerbated the flight crew's difficulties, as it increased the slant range from the crew's eyes to the runway and taxiway signage and pavement markings. After taxiing into position on what the KAL084 flight crew thought was runway 32, the captain expressed some uncertainty that the aircraft was on the correct runway, and briefly considered switching to runway 6R, but, reassured by his first officer's certainty that they were on runway 32, the captain reported at 14:03 that Flight 084 was holding in position on runway 32, and, at 14:04, the flight was cleared for takeoff. In actuality KAL084 was on runway 24R, approximately at the halfway point. They had insufficient runway length to complete a sufficient takeoff, even if the collision had not occurred. At no time did the flight crew, despite the uncertainty expressed by the captain, attempt to use their instruments to verify that the heading of the runway they were on matched that of runway 32; the NTSB was unable to determine the reason for this omission.

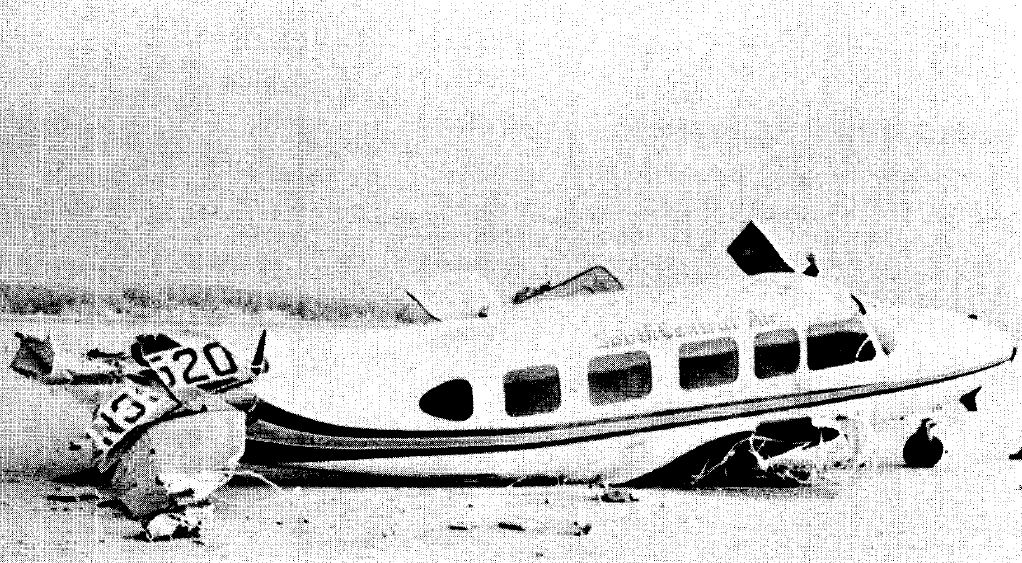
The wreckage of SouthCentral Air Flight 59 after the collision.

At 14:05:28, the Anchorage tower controller cleared SCA59 to taxi into position and hold on runway 6L, as the RVR had risen to the required 1,800 feet; 50 seconds later, at 14:06:18, KAL084 radioed that it was starting its takeoff roll. Shortly afterwards, the pilot of SCA59 saw headlights approaching, which he initially assumed to be from a truck on the runway. After realizing that the lights were in fact from an aircraft on its takeoff roll, he ducked down low and yelled for his passengers to do the same. Meanwhile, the captain of Flight 084, seeing the PA-31 in his aircraft's path, applied up elevator and left rudder, lifting the DC-10's nose landing gear off the ground and causing its main body gear (mounted on the aircraft's centerline between the left and right wing gear) to swing to the right; as a result, the PA-31's fuselage was straddled by the DC-10's body gear and left wing gear, instead of being struck head-on by the body gear (which would likely have resulted in fatalities on board the smaller aircraft). After striking Flight 59, KAL084 continued off the end of the runway at far below flying speed, (Note: The intersection of taxiway W-1 and runway 6L/24R, where the DC-10 began its takeoff roll, is approximately three-quarters of the way along runway 24R, leaving only 2,400 ft (730 m) until the end of the runway. At the weight, air temperature, and field elevation applicable for KAL 084, it would have required a runway length of 8,150 ft (2,480 m) to take off, more than three times the actual length available. As a result, the DC-10, starting from where it did, could not have successfully taken off even had it not collided with the PA-31.) crashed through seven non-frangible towers supporting the runway 6L approach lighting system, came to rest 1,434 ft (437 m) past the end of the runway, and immediately caught fire.

Three of the passengers on board SCA59 received minor injuries, while the remaining passengers and the pilot were uninjured, although the aircraft was destroyed by the impact (the left and right wings were sheared off by the DC-10's main landing gear, while the DC-10's nose gear caved in the right side of the cockpit roof and then tore off part of the PA-31's vertical stabilizer); the three flight crew of KAL084 were seriously injured by impact forces, but managed to escape their aircraft before it was consumed by fire. (Some initial media reports erroneously listed seven injuries among the SCA59 occupants and none aboard KAL084.)

== See also ==
- Runway safety
- 2001 Linate Airport runway collision, another runway collision in fog due to a pilot taking an incorrect taxi route
- 1990 Wayne County Airport runway collision, another runway collision in fog due to a pilot taking an incorrect taxi route
- 1983 Madrid Airport runway collision, another December 1983 runway collision in fog due to a pilot taking an incorrect taxi route
- Comair Flight 5191, another accident involving a flight crew taking off on a wrong runway when this could have been avoided by use of instruments to crosscheck the runway heading
- Singapore Airlines Flight 006, a case where a crew attempted a takeoff on a runway closed for construction, due, in part, to reduced visibility
- 2024 Haneda Airport runway collision, a runway collision at nighttime between a widebody airliner and a smaller turboprop plane that is currently under investigation.
