= Venera 16 =

1983 uncrewed Soviet spacecraft to Venus

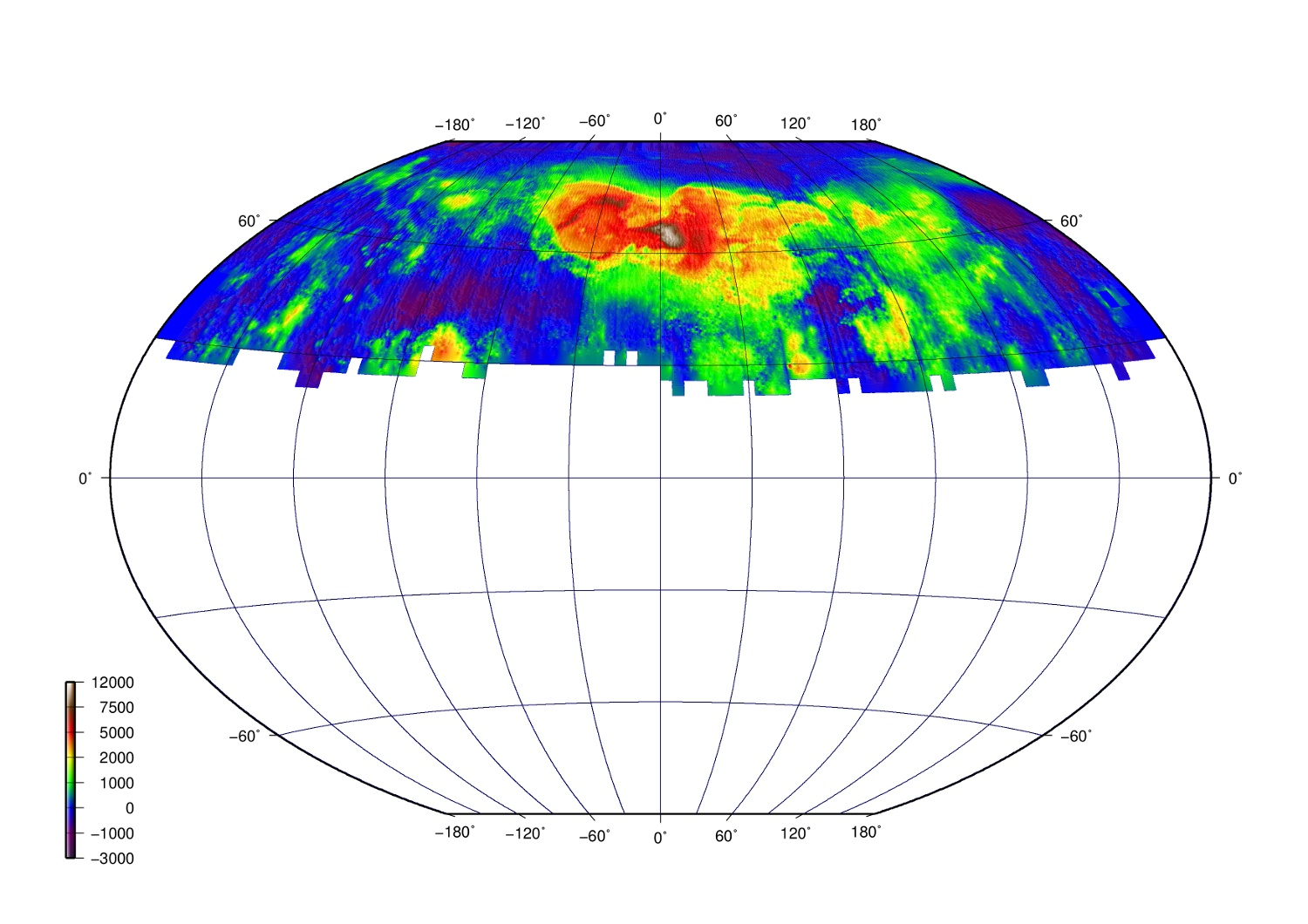
- Venusian topography by Veneras 15/16
- Mission type: Venus orbiter
- Operator: Soviet Academy of Sciences
- COSPAR ID: 1983-054A
- SATCAT no.: 14107
- Mission duration: Overall: 1 year, 1 month At Venus: 9 months

Spacecraft properties
- Spacecraft type: 4V-2
- Manufacturer: NPO Lavochkin
- Launch mass: 5,300 kilograms (11,700 lb)
- Dry mass: 4,000 kilograms (8,800 lb)

Start of mission
- Launch date: June 7, 1983, 02:32 UTC
- Rocket: Proton-K/D-1
- Launch site: Baikonur 200/40

End of mission
- Last contact: June 13, 1985

Orbital parameters
- Reference system: Cytherocentric
- Semi-major axis: 45,632.0 kilometres (28,354.4 mi)
- Pericytherion altitude: 7,081 kilometres (4,400 mi)
- Apocytherion altitude: 72,079 kilometres (44,788 mi)
- Inclination: 92.5 degrees
- Period: 24 hours

Venus orbiter
- Orbital insertion: October 11, 1983
- Orbits: 243

Venera 16 (Russian: Венера-16 meaning Venus 16) was a spacecraft sent to Venus by the Soviet Union. This uncrewed orbiter was to map the surface of Venus using high resolution imaging systems. The spacecraft was identical to Venera 15 and based on modifications to the earlier Venera space probes. The latest data from the spacecraft were received on June 13, 1985, when it responded to the signal sent from Earth for Vega 1.

== Mission profile ==
Venera 16 was launched on June 7, 1983, at 02:32:00 UTC and reached Venus's orbit on October 11, 1983.

The spacecraft was inserted into Venus orbit a day apart from Venera 15, with its orbital plane shifted by an angle of approximately 4° relative to one another probe. This made it possible to reimage an area if necessary. The spacecraft was in a nearly polar orbit with a periapsis of ~1,000 kilometres (620 mi), at 62°N latitude, and an apoapsis of ~65,000 kilometres (40,000 mi), with an inclination ~90°, the orbital period being ~24 hours.

Together with Venera 15, the spacecraft imaged the area from the north pole down to about 30°N latitude (i.e., approx. 25% of Venus's surface) over the 8 months of mapping operations.

== Spacecraft structure ==
The Venera 15 and 16 spacecraft were identical and were based on modifications to the orbiter portions of the Venera 9 and Venera 14 probes. Each spacecraft consisted of a 5 metres (16 ft) long cylinder with a 0.6 m (2.0 ft) diameter, 1.4 m (4.6 ft) tall parabolic dish antenna for the synthetic aperture radar at one end. A 1-metre (3 ft 3 in) diameter parabolic dish antenna for the radio altimeter was also located at this end. The electrical axis of the radio altimeter antenna was lined up with the axis of the cylinder. The electrical axis of the SAR deviated from the spacecraft axis by 10 degrees. During imaging, the radio altimeter would be lined up with the center of the planet (local vertical) and the SAR would be looking off to the side at 10 degrees. A bulge at the opposite end of the cylinder held fuel tanks and propulsion units. Two square solar arrays extended like wings from the sides of the cylinder. A 2.6-metre (8.5 ft) radio dish antenna for communications was also attached to the side of the cylinder. The spacecraft each weighed 4,000 kilograms (8,800 lb).

Both Venera 15 and 16 were equipped with a synthetic aperture radar. A radar was necessary in this mission because nothing else would be able to penetrate the dense clouds of Venus. The probes were equipped with on board computers that saved the images until the entire image was complete.

List of spacecraft instruments and experiments:

- Polyus-V Synthetic Aperture Radar
- Omega Radar Altimeter
- Infrared Fourier Spectrometer
- Cosmic-Ray Detectors (6 sensors)
- Solar-Plasma Detectors

To get to Venus, Venera 16 was placed in a heliocentric orbit with perihelion of 0.71 astronomical units, aphelion of 1.01 astronomical units, eccentricity of 0.17, orbital inclination of 2.3 degrees and orbital period of 293 days.

== See also ==
- List of missions to Venus
