= Venera 15 =

1983 uncrewed Soviet spacecraft to Venus

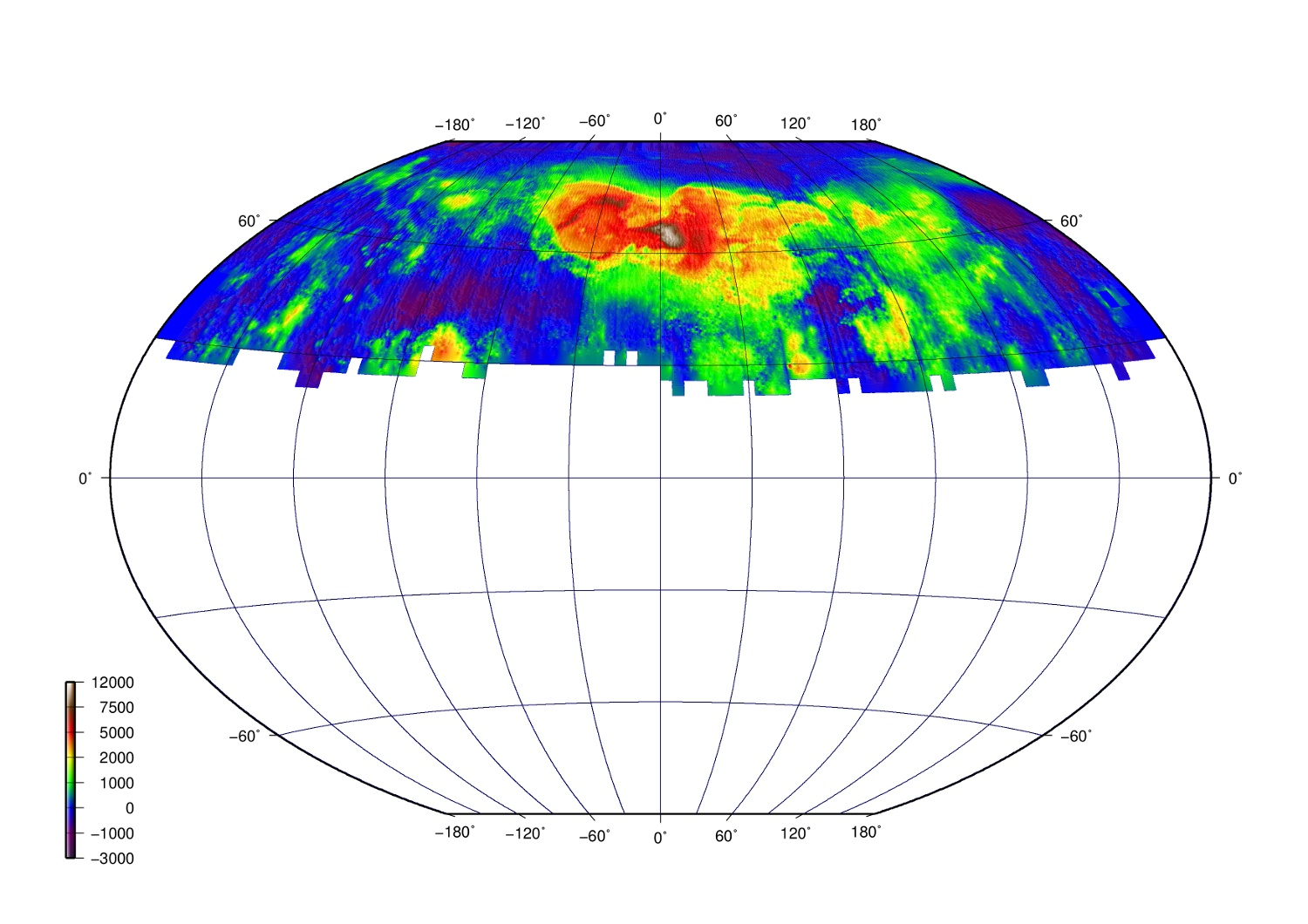
- Venusian topography by Veneras 15/16
- Mission type: Venus orbiter
- Operator: Soviet Academy of Sciences
- COSPAR ID: 1983-053A
- SATCAT no.: 14104
- Mission duration: Overall: 1 year, 1 month, 7 days At Venus: 9 months

Spacecraft properties
- Spacecraft type: 4V-2 No. 860
- Manufacturer: NPO Lavochkin
- Launch mass: 5,250 kg (11,570 lb)
- Dry mass: 4,000 kg (8,800 lb)

Start of mission
- Launch date: June 2, 1983, 02:38:39 UTC
- Rocket: Proton-K/D-1
- Launch site: Baikonur 200/39

End of mission
- Last contact: January 5, 1985

Orbital parameters
- Reference system: Cytherocentric
- Semi-major axis: 38,848 kilometres (24,139 mi)
- Eccentricity: 0.8211
- Pericytherion altitude: 7,081 kilometres (4,400 mi)
- Apocytherion altitude: 72,079 kilometres (44,788 mi)
- Inclination: 92.5 degrees
- Period: 24 hours
- Epoch: October 9, 1983

Venus orbiter
- Orbital insertion: October 10, 1983
- Orbits: 260

Venera 15 (Russian: Венера-15 meaning Venus 15) was a spacecraft sent to Venus by the Soviet Union. This uncrewed orbiter was to map the surface of Venus using high resolution imaging systems. The spacecraft was identical to Venera 16 and based on modifications to the earlier Venera space probes.

== Mission profile ==
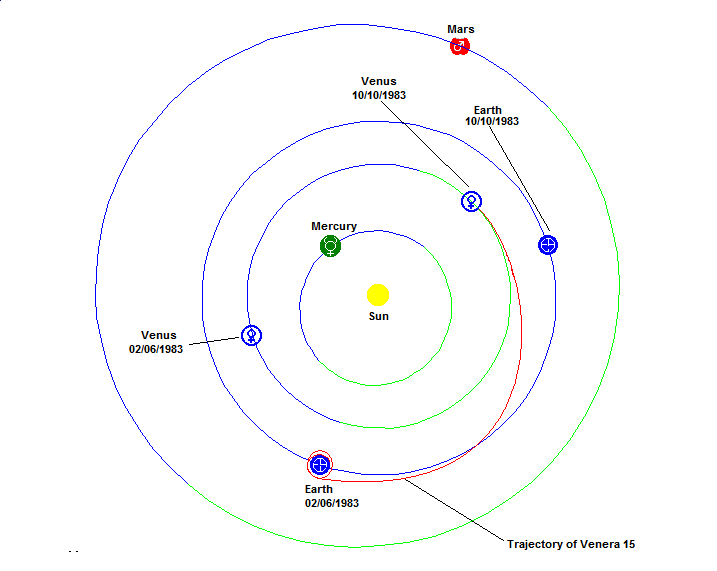
Flight profile of Venera 15

Venera 15 was launched on June 2, 1983, at 02:38:39 UTC and reached Venus's orbit on October 10, 1983.

The spacecraft was inserted into Venus orbit a day apart from Venera 16, with its orbital plane shifted by an angle of approximately 4° relative to the other probe. This made it possible to reimage an area if necessary. The spacecraft was in a nearly polar orbit with a periapsis ~1000 km, at 62°N latitude, and apoapsis ~65000 km, with an inclination ~90°, the orbital period being ~24 hours.

Together with Venera 16, the spacecraft imaged the area from the north pole down to about 30°N latitude (approximately 25% of Venus surface) over the eight months of mapping operations.

== Spacecraft structure ==
The Venera 15 and 16 spacecraft were identical and were based on modifications to the Venera 9 orbiter and the Venera 14 carrier spacecraft. Each spacecraft consisted of a 5 m (16 ft) long cylinder with a 0.6 m (2.0 ft) diameter, 1.4 m (4.6 ft) tall parabolic dish antenna for the synthetic aperture radar (SAR) at one end. A 1-meter diameter parabolic dish antenna for the radio altimeter was also located at this end. The electrical axis of the radio altimeter antenna was lined up with the axis of the cylinder. The electrical axis of the SAR deviated from the spacecraft axis by 10 degrees. During imaging, the radio altimeter would be lined up with the center of the planet (local vertical) and the SAR would be looking off to the side at 10 degrees. A bulge at the opposite end of the cylinder held fuel tanks and propulsion units. Two square solar arrays extended like wings from the sides of the cylinder. A 2.6 m (8.5 ft) radio dish antenna for communications was also attached to the side of the cylinder. The spacecraft each massed 4,000 kg (8,800 lb).

Both Venera 15 and 16 were equipped with a synthetic-aperture radar (SAR). A radar was necessary in this mission because nothing else would be able to penetrate the dense clouds of Venus. The probes were equipped with on board computers that saved the images until the entire image was complete. This radar system replaced the normal landers that previous Venera probes brought to Venus.

List of spacecraft instruments and experiments:

- Polyus-V Synthetic Aperture Radar
- Omega Radar altimeter
- Infrared Fourier Spectrometer
- Cosmic-Ray Detectors (6 sensors)
- Solar-Plasma Detectors

To get to Venus, Venera 15 was placed in a heliocentric orbit with perihelion of 0.71 AU, apohelion of 1.01 AU, eccentricity of 0.17, orbital inclination of 2.3 degrees and orbital period of 293 days.

== See also ==
- List of missions to Venus
