= Aikhylu Chasma =

Tectonic rift valley on Venus

- Feature type: Tectonic rift valley
- Coordinates: 32°N 292°E
- Diameter: 300 km long
- Eponym: Aikhylu

Aikhylu Chasma is a tectonic rift valley on Venus, and the landing site of the Venera 9 lander. It is located in Beta Regio.
