= Venera 13 =

Soviet space probe that landed on Venus in 1982

- Mission type: Venus flyby / lander
- Operator: Soviet Academy of Sciences
- COSPAR ID: 1981-106A; 1981-106D
- SATCAT no.: 12927; 15599
- Mission duration: Travel: 4 months, 2 days Lander: 127 minutes

Spacecraft properties
- Spacecraft type: 4V-1 no.760
- Manufacturer: NPO Lavochkin
- Launch mass: 4,397.8 kilograms (9,695 lb)
- Landing mass: 760 kg (1,680 lb)
- Dry mass: 1,643.72 kg (3,623.8 lb)
- Dimensions: 2.7 m × 2.3 m × 2.7 m (8.9 ft × 7.5 ft × 8.9 ft)

Start of mission
- Launch date: October 30, 1981, 06:04:00 UTC
- Rocket: Proton-K/D-1 8K82K
- Launch site: Baikonur 200/40

End of mission
- Last contact: lander: March 1, 1982 / carrier: at least until April 25, 1983

Orbital parameters
- Reference system: Heliocentric
- Eccentricity: 0.17
- Perihelion altitude: 0.70 AU
- Aphelion altitude: 0.99 AU
- Inclination: 2.3 degrees
- Period: 285 days

Flyby of Venus
- Spacecraft component: Venera 13 flight platform
- Closest approach: March 1, 1982
- Distance: ~36,000 kilometres (22,000 mi)

Venus lander
- Spacecraft component: Venera 13 descent craft
- Landing date: 03:57:21, March 1, 1982
- Landing site: 7.5°S 303°E (east of Phoebe Regio)
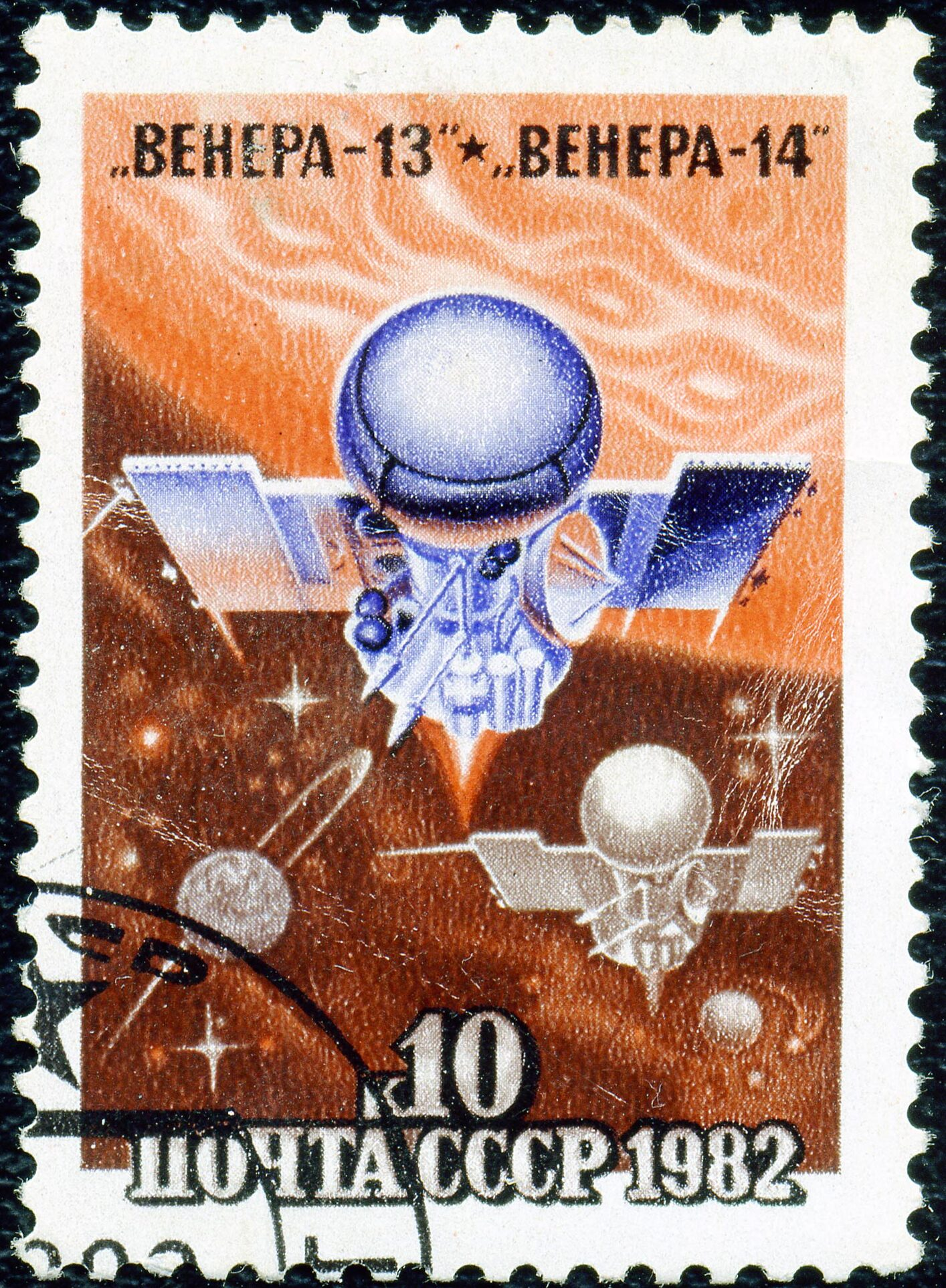
- Venera

Venera 13 (Russian: Венера-13 'Venus 13') was part of the Soviet Venera program meant to explore Venus.

Venera 13 and 14 were identical spacecraft built to take advantage of the 1981 Venus launch opportunity. The probes were launched five days apart, with Venera 13 launching on 30 October 1981 at 06:04 UTC and Venera 14 launching on 4 November 1981 at 05:31 UTC. Both had an on-orbit dry mass of 760 kg.

Venera 13 transmitted the first recording of sounds from another planet, including sounds of Venusian wind, the lander hitting the ground, pyrotechnic lens cap removal and its impact on regolith, and action of the regolith drilling apparatus.

The descent lasted for about an hour. Venera 13 landed on 1 March 1982 at 03:57:21 UT at 7.5 S, 303 E, just east of the eastern extension of an elevated region known as Phoebe Regio. The area is composed of bedrock outcrops surrounded by dark, fine-grained soil.

== Design ==
=== Cruise stage ===
As the cruise stage flew by Venus, the bus acted as a data relay for the lander before continuing on to a heliocentric orbit. The probe was equipped with a gamma-ray spectrometer, UV grating monochromator, electron and proton spectrometers, gamma-ray burst detectors, solar wind plasma detectors, and two-frequency transmitters which made measurements before, during, and after the Venus flyby. The bus continued to provide data until at least 25 April 1983.

=== Descent lander ===
The lander was a hermetically-sealed pressure vessel and contained most of the instrumentation and electronics. The lander survived the heat by containing blocks of lithium nitrate, a salt-like substance which has a very high heat of fusion. Mounted on a ring-shaped landing platform and topped by an antenna, the landers design was similar to the earlier Venera 9–12 landers. An air brake was used to slow down Venera, (this is different to the previous landers, which used parachutes, making them prone to failure.). It carried instruments to take chemical and isotopic measurements, monitor the spectrum of scattered sunlight, and record electric discharges during its descent phase through the Venusian atmosphere. The spacecraft utilized a camera system, an x-ray fluorescence spectrometer, a screw drill and surface sampler, a dynamic penetrometer, and a seismometer to conduct investigations on the surface.

The list of lander experiments and instruments include:

- accelerometer, impact analysis – Bison-M
- thermometers, barometers – ITD
- spectrometer / directional photometer – IOAV-2
- ultraviolet photometer
- mass spectrometer – MKh-6411
- penetrometer / regolith ohmmeter – PrOP-V
- chemical redox indicator – Kontrast
- 2 color telephotometer cameras – TFZL-077
- gas chromatograph – Sigma-2
- radio / seismometer – Groza-2
- nephelometer – MNV-78-2
- hydrometer – VM-3R
- x-ray fluorescence spectrometer (aerosol) – BDRA-1V
- x-ray fluorescence spectrometer (regolith) – Arakhis-2
- regolith drilling apparatus – GZU VB-02 stabilized oscillator / Doppler radio
- small solar batteries – MSB

== Landing ==
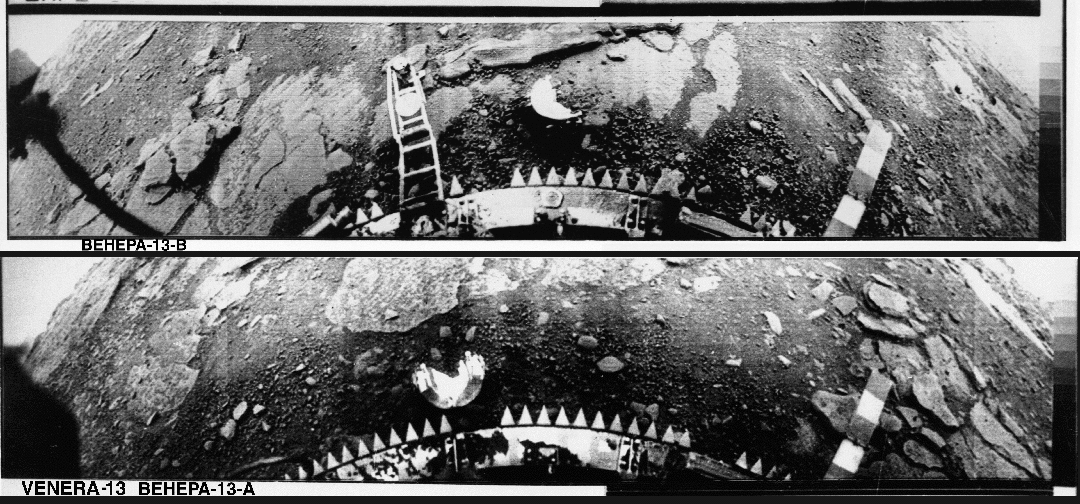
Surface panoramas taken by Venera 13

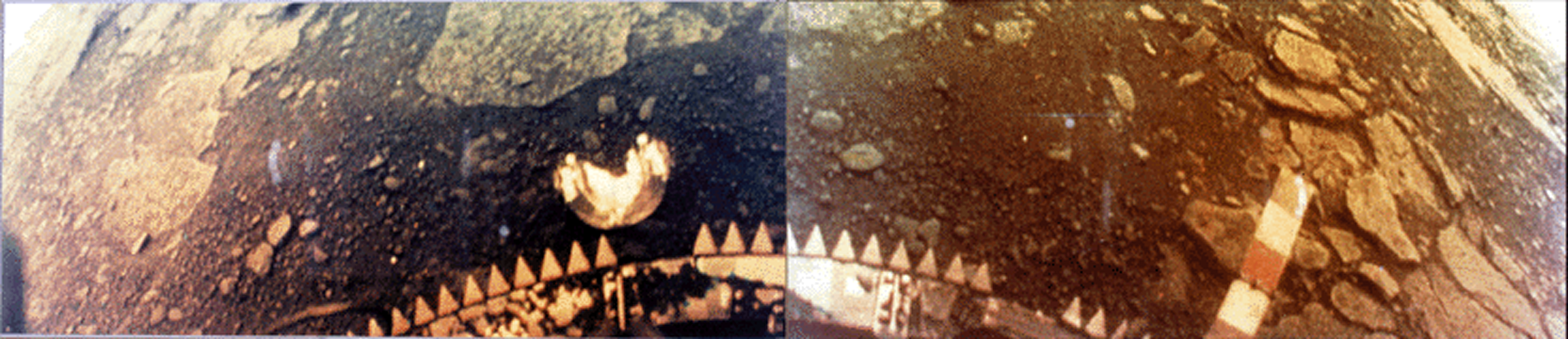
Colourized panorama

On 1 March 1982, after launch and a four-month cruise to Venus, the descent vehicle separated from the cruise stage and plunged into the Venusian atmosphere. A parachute deployed once the lander entered the Venusian atmosphere. The parachute detached at about 50 kilometres (31 mi) above the surface; simple air braking was used for the final descent.

Venera 13 landed at around 7–8 metres per second (23–26 ft/s) at 7.5°S 303°E, just east of the eastern extension of an elevated region known as Phoebe Regio, and about 950 km (590 mi) northeast of where Venera 14 would land several days later.

The Venera 13 lander was equipped with cameras to photograph the surface and spring-loaded arms to measure the compressibility of regolith. The quartz camera windows were covered by lens caps that popped off after descent. However, only one of these worked for Venera 13.

The landing area was composed of bedrock outcrops surrounded by dark, fine-grained regolith. After landing, the lander began to take a panoramic photograph while a mechanical drilling arm obtained surface samples. The samples were deposited in a hermetically sealed chamber, maintained at 30 °C (86 °F) and a pressure of about 0.05 atmosphere (5 kPa). Sample composition was determined by the X-ray fluorescence spectrometer to be in the class of weakly-differentiated melanocratic alkaline gabbroids.

Although the lander was designed to function for about 32 minutes, it continued to operate for at least 127 minutes in an environment where the temperature was 457 °C (855 °F) and the pressure was 9.0 MPa (89 standard atmospheres). Data was transmitted by the lander to the satellite, which functioned as a data relay as it flew by Venus.

In order to measure surface wind speed, microphones on the probe recorded atmospheric wind noises (the probe also recorded noises associated with the probe's equipment). This was the first recording of sound on another planet. Venera 14 would also make similar recordings.

== Suggested photographic evidence of life ==
Leonid Ksanfomaliti^{[:ru]} of Space Research Institute of the Russian Academy of Sciences (a contributor to the Venera mission) and Stan Karaszewski of Karas, suggested signs of life in the Venera images in an article published in Solar System Research. According to Ksanfomaliti, certain objects resembled a "disk", a "black flap" and a "scorpion" which "emerge, fluctuate and disappear", referring to their changing location on photographs and traces on the ground.

Engineers familiar with the probe have identified the moving "disk" as actually being the two lens caps ejected from the lander. Rather than a single object that had moved between two places, they are simply two inanimate similar-looking objects in different places. The other "objects" are ascribed to image processing artifacts and do not appear in the original photography.

The editors of Solar System Research published an editorial comment and a number of commentary articles from other scientists in their September 2012 publication of Issue 5, Volume 46 of the journal. That issue also includes a second article from Ksanfomaliti, in which he claims to identify several other life forms and speculates regarding the apparent rich diversity of life around the landing site.

These claims have been refuted by the Live Science website.

== Post encounter ==
The spacecraft bus ended up in a heliocentric orbit where it continued to make observations in the X-ray and gamma ray spectrum. To provide data for the later Vega mission the bus activated its engine on 10 June 1982. The last data published for the probe is from 12 April 1983.

== In fiction ==
- The Venera 13 lander appears in the short film Horses on Mars (2001) with a message to the main character who is a microbe lost on Venus.
- The Venera lander appears in the book Contact (Sagan, 1985).

== See also ==
- List of missions to Venus
