= Venera 10 =

Space probe

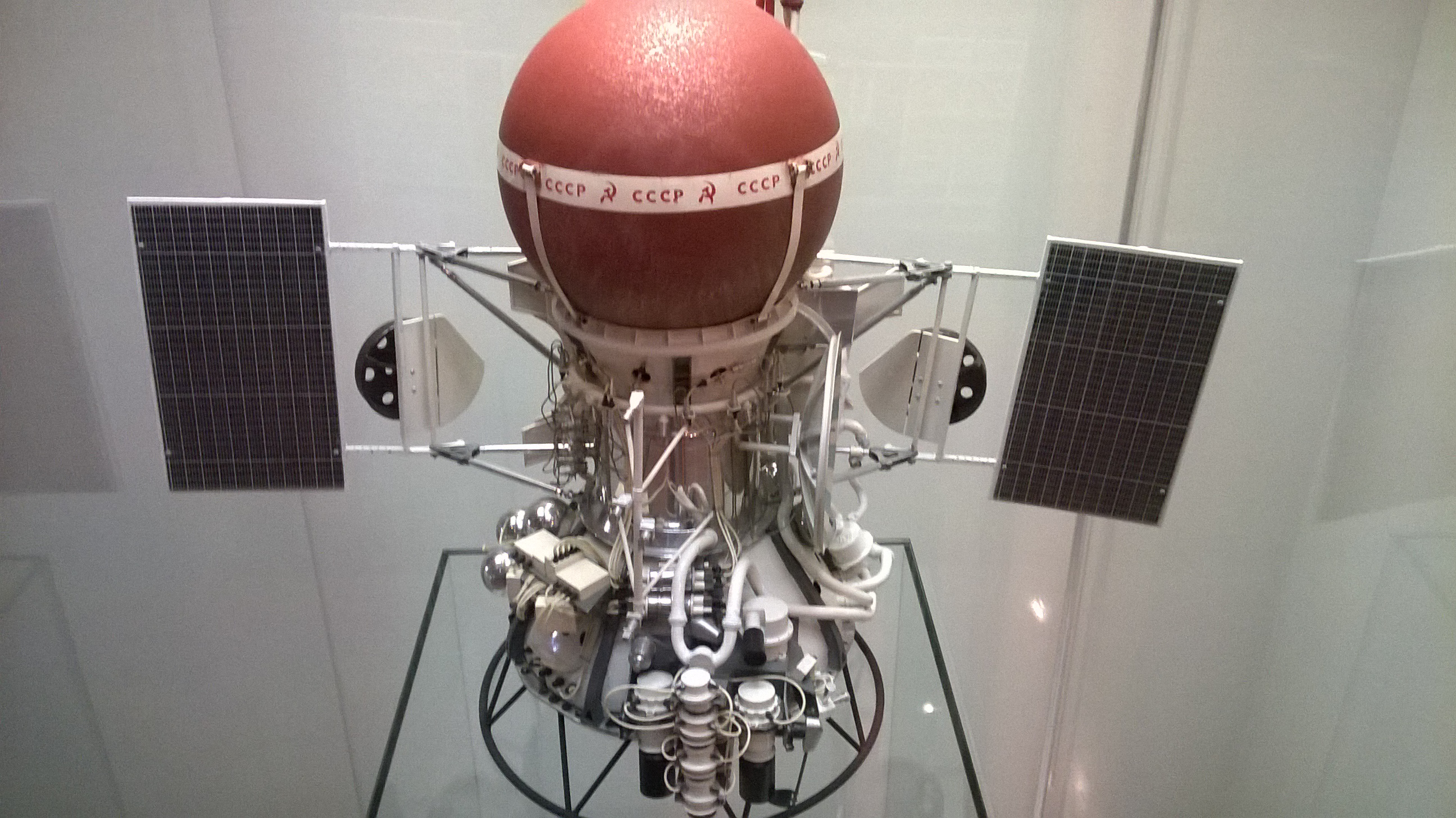
- Venera 10
- Mission type: Venus orbiter / lander
- Operator: Lavochkin
- COSPAR ID: 1975-054A; 1975-054D (lander)
- SATCAT no.: 7947; 8423
- Mission duration: Travel: 4 months and 9 days Orbiter: 144 days Lander: 65 minutes Last contact: 286 days

Spacecraft properties
- Spacecraft type: 4V-1 No. 661
- Manufacturer: Lavochkin
- Launch mass: 5,033 kg (11,096 lb)
- BOL mass: 2,230 kg (4,920 lb)
- Landing mass: 1,560 kg (3,440 lb)
- Dimensions: 2.7 m × 2.3 m × 5.7 m (8.9 ft × 7.5 ft × 18.7 ft)

Start of mission
- Launch date: June 14, 1975, 03:00:31 UTC
- Rocket: Proton with upper and escape stages
- Launch site: Baikonur 81/24

End of mission
- Last contact: "[Orbiter transmitted] data until at least June 1976."

Orbital parameters
- Reference system: Cytherocentric
- Eccentricity: 0.8798
- Pericytherion altitude: 1,620 kilometers (1,010 mi)
- Apocytherion altitude: 113,900 kilometers (70,800 mi)
- Inclination: 29.5°
- Period: 49.4 hours
- Revolution no.: 71

Venus orbiter
- Orbital insertion: October 23, 1975

Venus lander
- Spacecraft component: Venera 10 descent craft
- Landing date: 02:17, October 25, 1975
- Landing site: 15.42°N 291.51°E (near Beta Regio)

Venera 10 (Russian: Венера-10 meaning Venus 10), or 4V-1 No. 661, was a Soviet uncrewed space mission to Venus. It consisted of an orbiter and a lander. It was launched on June 14, 1975, 03:00:31 UTC and had a mass of 5033 kg (11096 lb).

== Orbiter ==
When the mission launched, the Soviet Union only disclosed that the mission's objective was to explore Venus and the surrounding space. Western sources speculated that the spacecraft contained a lander.

The orbiter entered Venus orbit on October 23, 1975. Its mission was to serve as a communications relay for the lander and to explore cloud layers and atmospheric parameters with several instruments and experiments:

- 1.6–2.8 μm IR Spectrometer
- 8–28 μm IR Radiometer
- 352 nm UV Photometer
- 2 Photopolarimeters (335–800 nm)
- 300–800 nm Spectrometer
- Lyman-α H/D Spectrometer
- Bistatic radar mapping
- CM, DM radio occultations
- Triaxial Magnetometer
- 345–380 nm UV Camera
- 355–445 nm Camera
- 6 Electrostatic analyzers
- 2 Modulation Ion Traps
- Low-Energy Proton / Alpha detector
- Low-Energy Electron detector
- 3 Semiconductor counters
- 2 Gas-Discharge counters
- Cherenkov detector

The orbiter consisted of a cylinder with two solar panel wings and a high gain parabolic antenna attached to the curved surface. A bell-shaped unit holding propulsion systems was attached to the bottom of the cylinder, and mounted on top was a 2.4 metres (7 ft 10 in) sphere which held the landers. To reach Venus, the spacecraft traveled in a heliocentric orbit from Earth to the planet with perihelion of 0.72 AU, apohelion of 1.02 AU, eccentricity of 0.17, inclination of 2.3 degrees and orbital period of 294 days.

== Lander ==
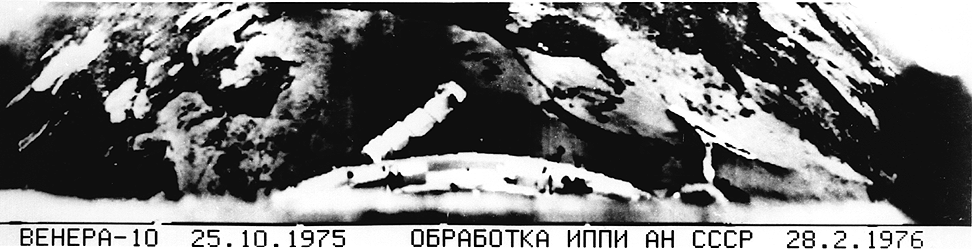
Surface of Venus as photographed by the Venera 10 lander

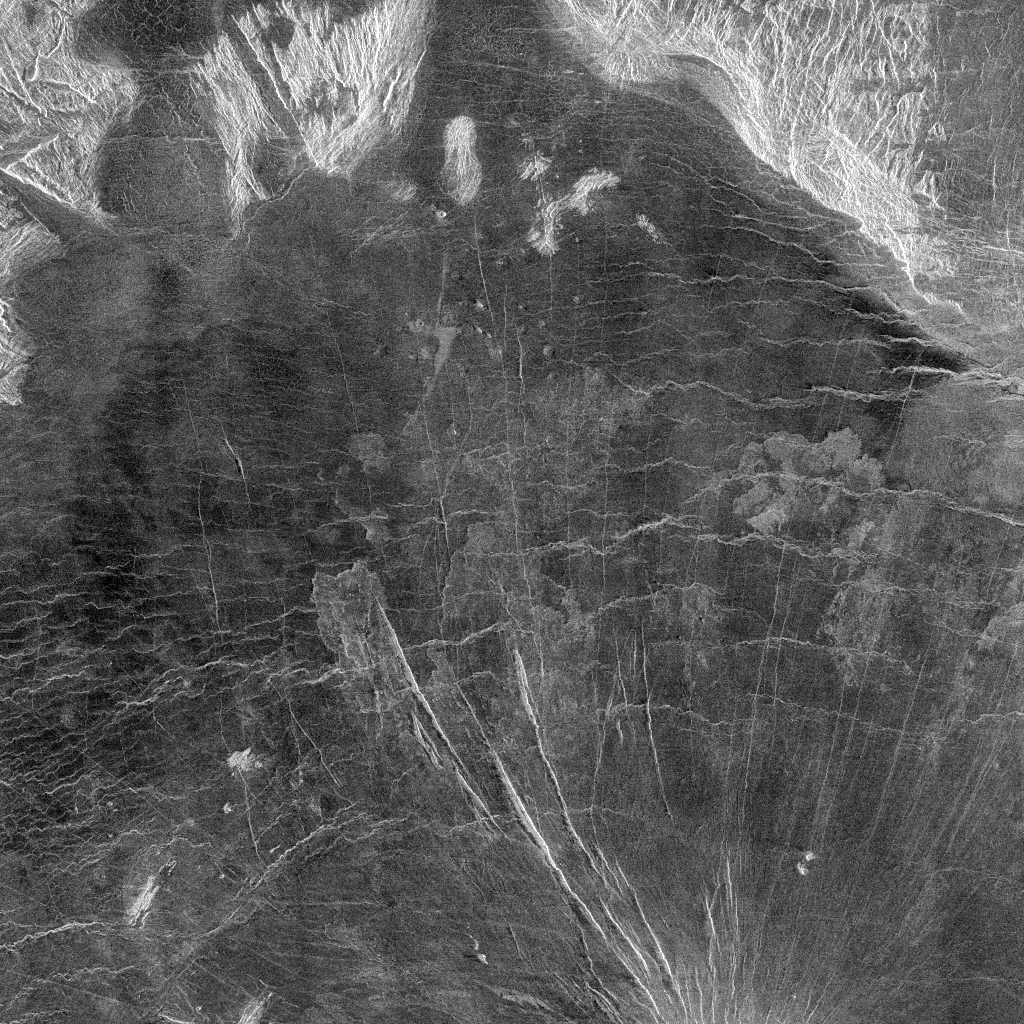
Landing area of Venera 10 as mapped by the Magellan orbiter

On October 23, 1975, the lander separated from the orbiter, and touched down with the sun near zenith, at 05:17 UT, on October 25. A system of circulating fluid was used to distribute the heat load. This system, plus precooling prior to entry, permitted operation of the spacecraft for 65 minutes after landing. During descent, heat dissipation and deceleration were accomplished sequentially by protective hemispheric shells, three parachutes, a disk-shaped drag brake, and a compressible, metal, doughnut-shaped, landing cushion.

It landed near the border area between Beta Regio and Hyndla Regio (within a 150 km radius of 15.42°N 291.51°E), three days after the touchdown of, and 2200 km from Venera 9. Venera 10 measured a surface windspeed of 3.5 m/s. Other measurements included atmospheric pressure at various heights, and temperature, and surface light levels. Venera 10 was the second probe to send back black and white television pictures from the Venusian surface (after Venera 9). Venera 10 photographs showed lava rocks of pancake shape with lava or other weathered rocks in between. Planned 360 degree panoramic pictures could not be taken because, as with Venera 9, one of two camera lens covers failed to come off, limiting pictures to 180 degrees.

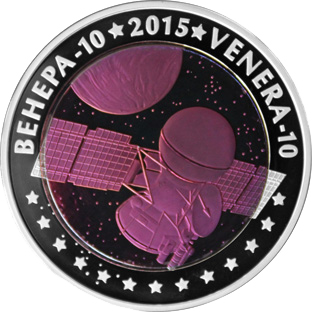
Kazakhstan coin featuring Venera 10

The lander communicated with Earth using the Venera 10 orbiter as a communication relay.

Lander payload:

- Temperature and pressure sensors
- Accelerometer
- Visible / IR photometer – IOV-75
- Backscatter and multi-angle nephelometers – MNV-75
- P-11 Mass spectrometer – MAV-75
- Panoramic telephotometers (2, with lamps)
- Anemometer – ISV-75
- Gamma-ray spectrometer – GS-12V
- Gamma ray densitometer – RP-75
- Radio Doppler experiment

== See also ==
- List of missions to Venus
- Timeline of artificial satellites and space probes
