= Cytherocentric orbit =

Orbit around planet Venus

Animation of JAXA probe Akatsuki's trajectory around Venus from 1 December 2015 Akatsuki · Venus

A Cytherocentric orbit is an orbit around the planet Venus. Venus has no moon, but several man-made objects orbit the planet.

The name is analogous to the term geocentric orbit for an orbit around Earth and heliocentric orbit for an orbit around the Sun. The apsides of an Cytherocentric orbit are pericytherion, the pericenter (analogous to perigee), and the apocenter is named apocytherion (analogous to apogee).

== Etymology ==
The cythero- prefix is derived from Cytherea, an alternate name of the goddess Aphrodite, who according to Greek mythology was born on the island of Cythera. Aphrodite is the equivalent of the Roman goddess Venus. Therefore, naming an orbit around Venus cytherocentric is a way of referencing Venus' association with this goddess.

== Satellites in Cytherocentric orbit ==
Venera 9 was the first satellite to achieve Venus orbit in 22 October 1975. Akatsuki was the most recent probe to achieve Venus orbit, having done so on 7 December 2015. JAXA formally terminated the mission on 18 September 2025, after contact with the spacecraft was lost in late April 2024.

Eight probes have achieved Venus orbit:

- 4 Soviet Union probes, Venera 9, Venera 10, Venera 15, Venera 16
- Two NASA probes, Magellan, Pioneer Venus 1 (Pioneer Venus 1, launched on 20 May 1978, was the first United States spacecraft to orbit Venus)
- One JAXA probe, Akatsuki
- One ESA probe, Venus Express.

Venus Express, launched on 9 November 2005, was the first European spacecraft to orbit Venus. In order to enter Venus orbit, a satellite has to perform an engine burn to reduce the speed. Otherwise, the probe moves too fast to achieve orbit and will be a flyby. A noteworthy case is that of Japanese probe Akatsuki, which failed to enter orbit around Venus on 6 December 2010. JAXA stated on 8 December that the probe's orbital insertion maneuver had failed, because of a defect in the orbital insertion burn. After the craft orbited the Sun for five years, engineers successfully placed it into an alternative Venusian elliptic orbit on 7 December 2015 by firing its attitude control thrusters for 20 minutes, making it Japan's first planetary orbiter beyond Earth. Akatsuki subsequently observed Venus's atmosphere for more than eight years. Its scientific achievements included the discovery of the largest stationary gravity wave (mountain wave) in the Solar System, and the elucidation of the mechanism behind the high-speed atmospheric super-rotation of Venus.

Magellan was the first interplanetary probe to use aerobraking to reduce the apocytherion. By passing through the dense atmosphere, a probe can reduce its speed and attain the necessary delta-v. Venus's thick atmosphere supports aerobraking. This reduces fuel needs.

== Stationary and synchronous orbits ==
A satellite with revolutionary period that matches the planet's rotational period appears fixed at a position in the sky relative to an observer on the planet. Such an orbit on Earth is a Geostationary orbit.

The height of a stationary or synchronous orbit can be calculated as follows:

$R_{syn} = \sqrt[3]{{G(m_2)T^2\over 4 \pi^2}}$

where G is the gravitational constant, m_{2} is the mass of the celestial body, and T is the sidereal rotational period of the body.

By this formula one can find the geostationary-analogous cytherostationary orbit. Around Venus, such an orbit would be 1,536,600 km or about 253 Venus radii from the planet's surface. This is because Venus has the slowest rotation rate of any planet. The slower the rotation, the farther away a satellite must be in order to be stationary. The hill sphere of a celestial body describes the region in which the gravity of that body is dominant. The hill sphere radius of Venus is about 1 million kilometers; and as the cytherostationary orbital distance lies outside of it, no stable cytherostationary satellite can exist.

== See also ==
- Orbit of Venus
- Areocentric orbit
