= Runway visual range =

Measure of aircraft visual distance

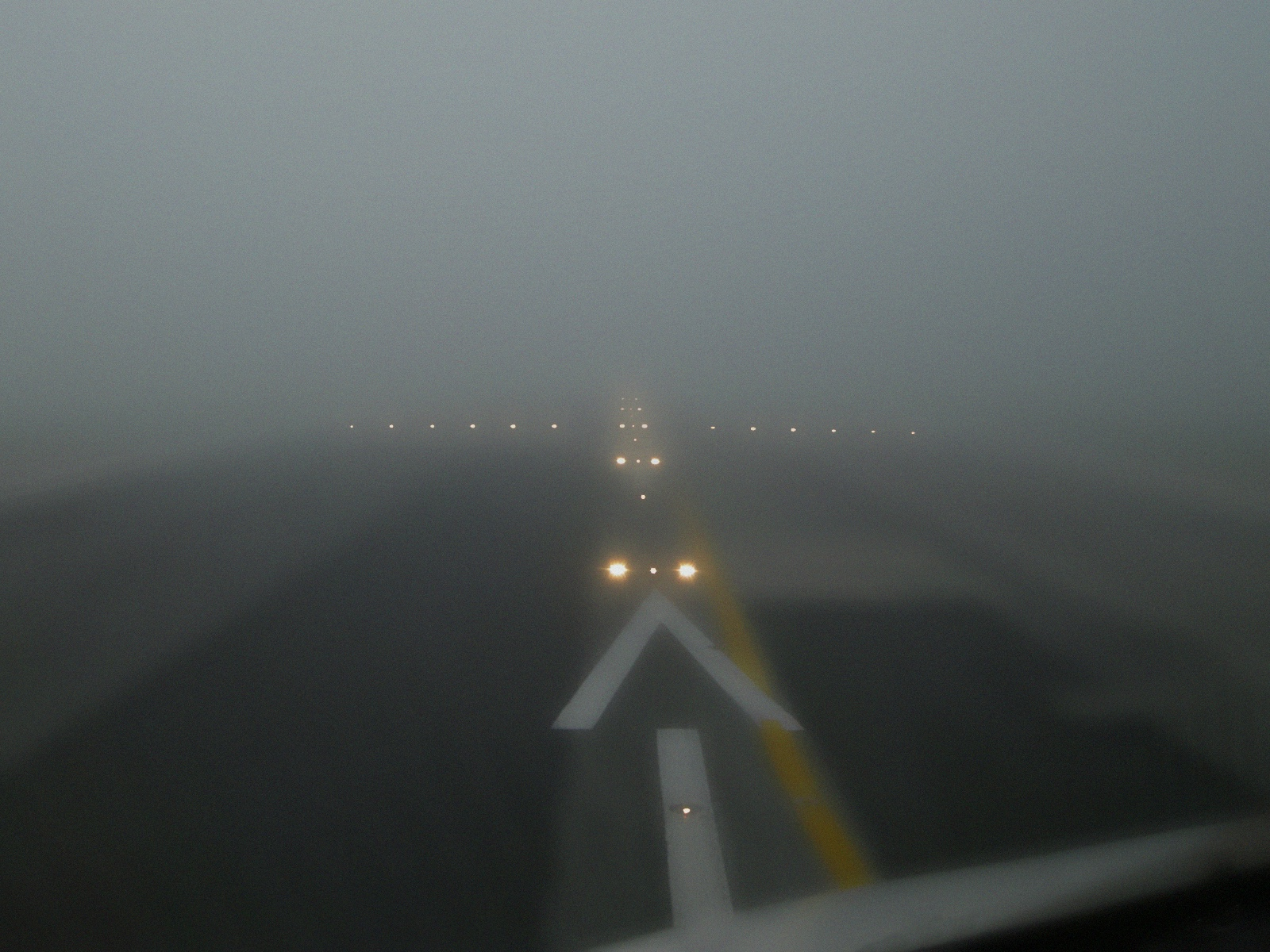
A pilot's view of Lisbon Airport's runway 21 in fog; runway visual range is about 200 m (660 ft)

In aviation, the runway visual range (RVR) is the distance over which a pilot of an aircraft on the centreline of the runway can see the runway surface markings delineating the runway or the lights delineating the runway or identifying its centre line. RVR is normally expressed in meters or feet. RVR is used to determine the landing and takeoff conditions for aircraft pilots, as well as the type of operational visual aids used at the airport.

== Measurement ==
Originally RVR was measured by a person, either by viewing the runway lights from the top of a vehicle parked on the runway threshold, or by viewing special angled runway lights from a tower at one side of the runway. The number of lights visible could then be converted to a distance to give the RVR. This is known as the human observer method and can still be used as a fall-back.

Today most airports use instrumented runway visual range (IRVR), which is measured by devices called scatterometers which provide simplified installation as they are integrated units and can be installed as a single unit(s) at a critical location along the runway or transmissometers which are installed at one side of a runway close to its edge. Normally three transmissometers are provided, one at each end of the runway and one at the midpoint. Runway visual range is derived from Runway Visibility Value, a direct measurement by a transmissometer, then calibrated to represent what a pilot in an approaching aircraft could see when observing the runway, though it measures horizontal visual range instead of slant visual range.

In the US, Forward Scatter RVRs are replacing transmissometers at most airports. According to the US Federal Aviation Administration: "There are approximately 279 RVR systems in the NAS, of which 242 are forward scatter NG RVR Systems and 34 are older Transmissometer Systems."

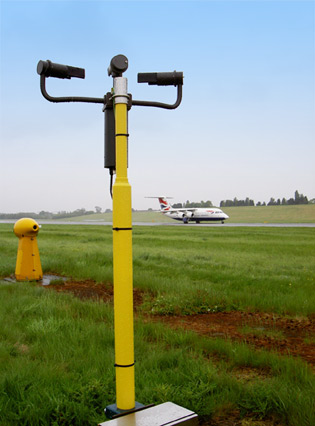
An AGVIS FSI scatterometer.

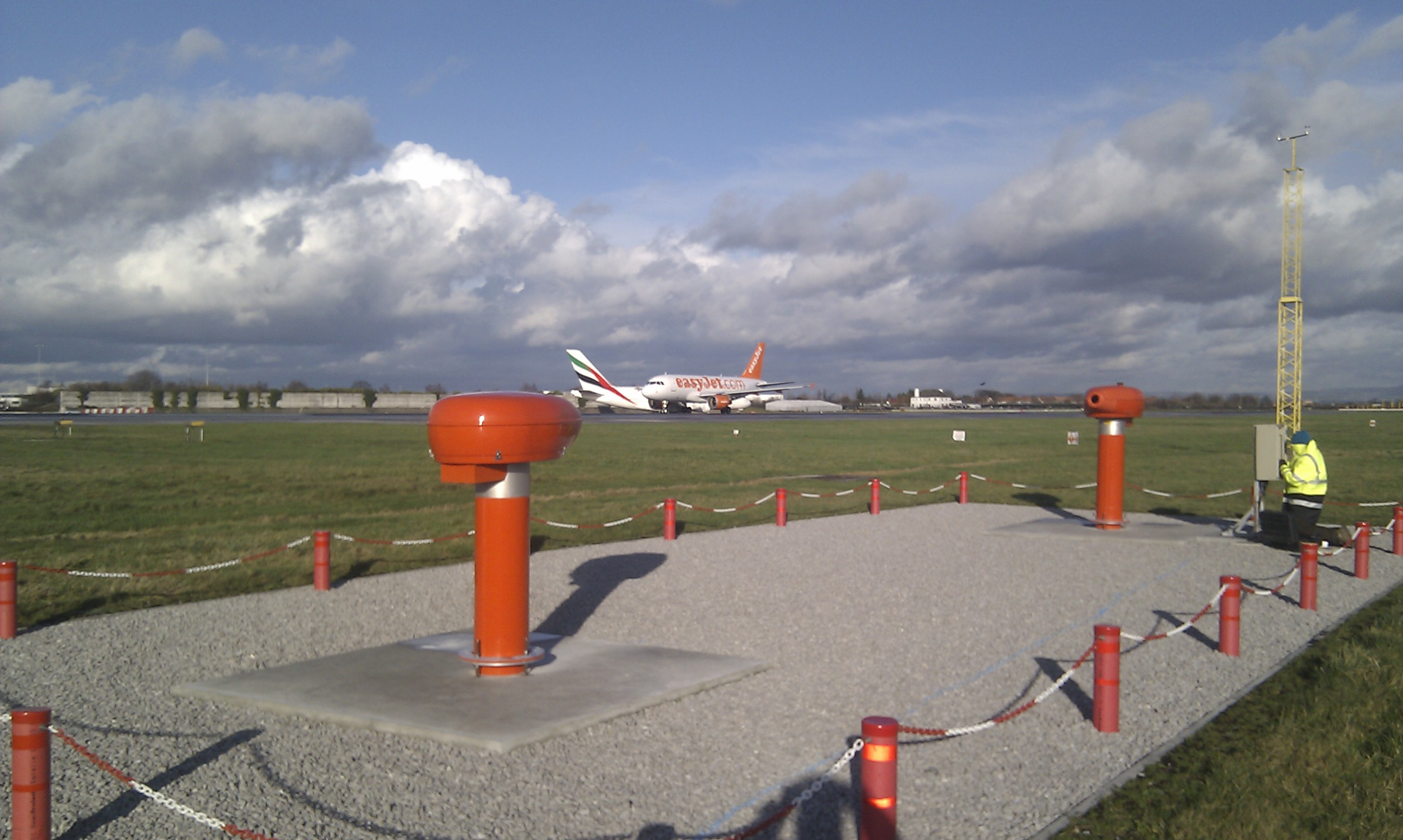
An AGIVIS 2000 transmissometer.

=== Data reliability ===
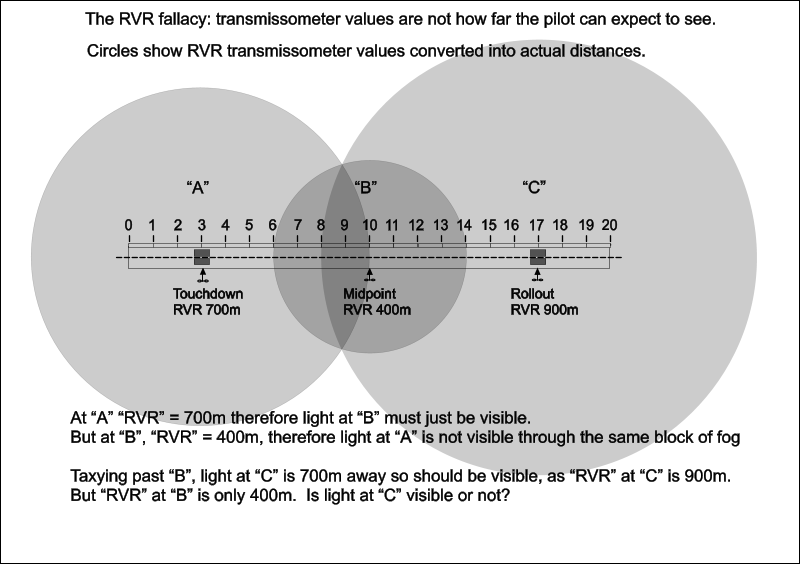
A diagram of how RVR could vary along the runway

Because IRVR data are localized information, the values obtained are not necessarily a reliable guide to what a pilot can actually expect to see. This can easily be demonstrated when obscuration such as fog is variable, different values can apply simultaneously at the same physical point.

For example, a 2000 m runway could have reported touchdown, midpoint and rollout IRVR values of 700m, 400m and 900 m. If the actual RVR at the touchdown point (300 m from the threshold) is 700 m as reported, then a pilot could expect to see the light 700 m away, at the runway midpoint. If the pilot taxies to the midpoint and looks back through the same air mass, he or she must also be able to see the light at the touchdown point, but since the midpoint RVR is reported as 400 m, a light 700 m away must be invisible. Similarly, looking forward he or she cannot see the light in the rollout area, but according to the rollout RVR of 900m, the light there is visible and has already been so for the last 200 m.

== Usage ==
RVR is used as one of the main criteria for minima on instrument approaches, as in most cases a pilot must obtain visual reference of the runway to land an aircraft. The maximum RVR range is 2,000 metres or 6,000 feet, above which it is not significant and thus does not need to be reported. RVRs are provided in METARs and are transmitted by air traffic controllers to aircraft making approaches to allow pilots to assess whether it is prudent and legal to make an approach.

RVR is also the main criterion used to determine the category of visual aids that are installed at an airport. The International Civil Aviation Organization ICAO stipulates in its Annex 14 that for RVR values above 550 m, CAT I lighting shall be installed, if RVR is between 300 m and 549 m then CAT II lighting is required. CAT IIIa is installed for RVR values between 175 m and 300 m. CAT IIIb is required for RVR values between 50 m and 175 m while there is no RVR limitation for CAT IIIc visual aids.

== See also ==
- Index of aviation articles
- Visual approach slope indicator
- Instrument landing system localizer
- Instrument landing system glide path
- Weather radar
