= Venera 9 =

1975 Soviet uncrewed space mission to Venus

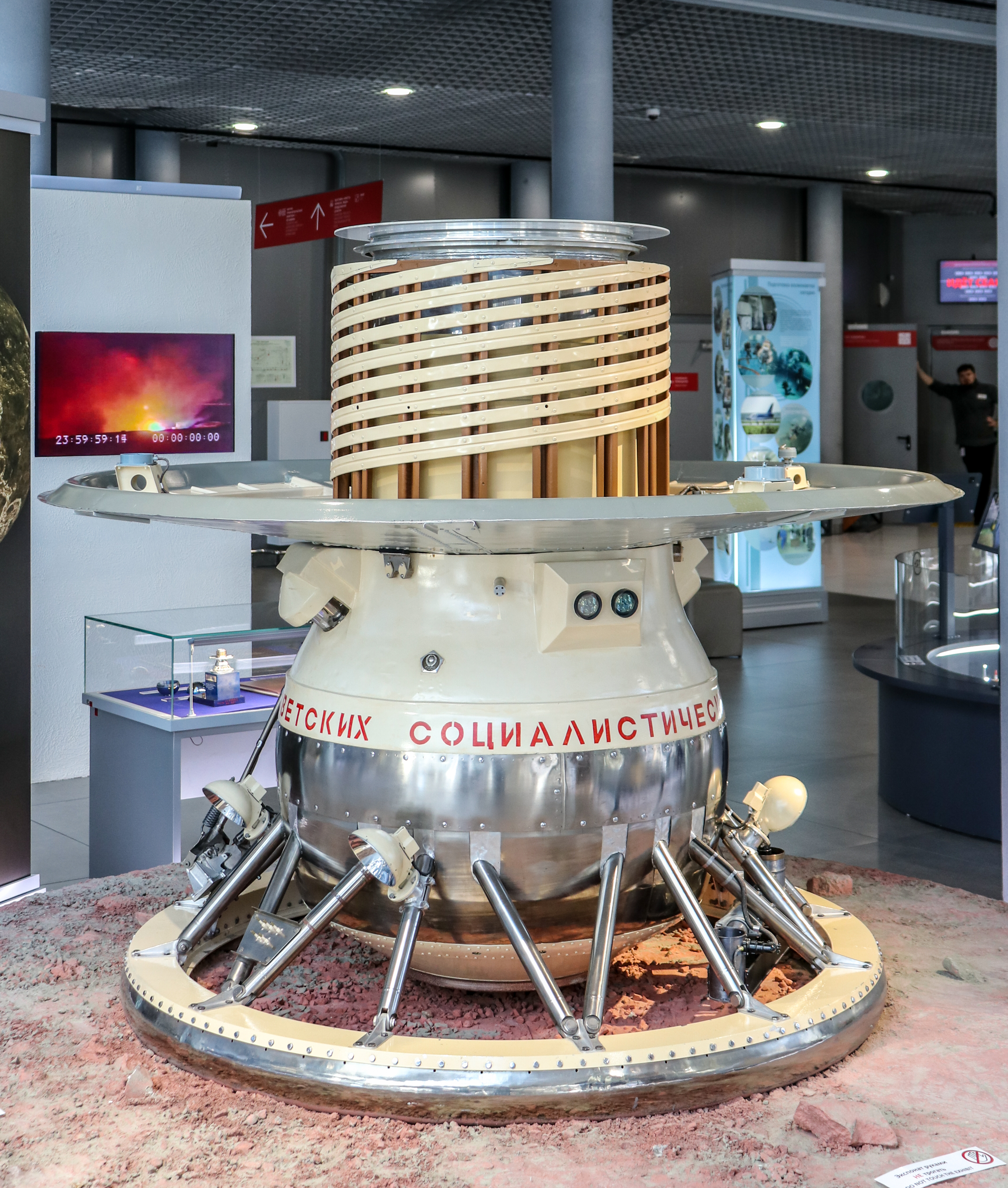
- Model of Venera 9 lander
- Mission type: Venus orbiter / lander
- Operator: Lavochkin
- COSPAR ID: 1975-050A; 1975-050D
- SATCAT no.: 7915; 8411
- Mission duration: Orbiter: 158 days Lander: 53 minutes Launch to last contact: 292 days

Spacecraft properties
- Spacecraft: 4V-1 No. 660
- Manufacturer: Lavochkin
- Launch mass: 4,936 kg (10,882 lb)
- Landing mass: 1,560 kg (3,440 lb)
- Payload mass: 660 kg (1,455 lb)

Start of mission
- Launch date: June 8, 1975, 02:38 UTC
- Rocket: Proton-K/D
- Launch site: Baikonur 81/24

End of mission
- Last contact: Orbiter primary mission: March 22, 1976; Lander: October 22, 1975

Orbital parameters
- Reference system: Cytherocentric
- Eccentricity: 0.89002
- Pericytherion altitude: 7,625 km (4,738 mi)
- Apocytherion altitude: 118,072 km (73,367 mi)
- Inclination: 29.5 degrees
- Period: 48.3 hours

Venus orbiter
- Spacecraft component: Orbiter
- Orbital insertion: October 20, 1975

Venus lander
- Spacecraft component: Lander
- Landing date: October 22, 1975, 05:13 UTC
- Landing site: 31.01°N 291.64°E (near Beta Regio)
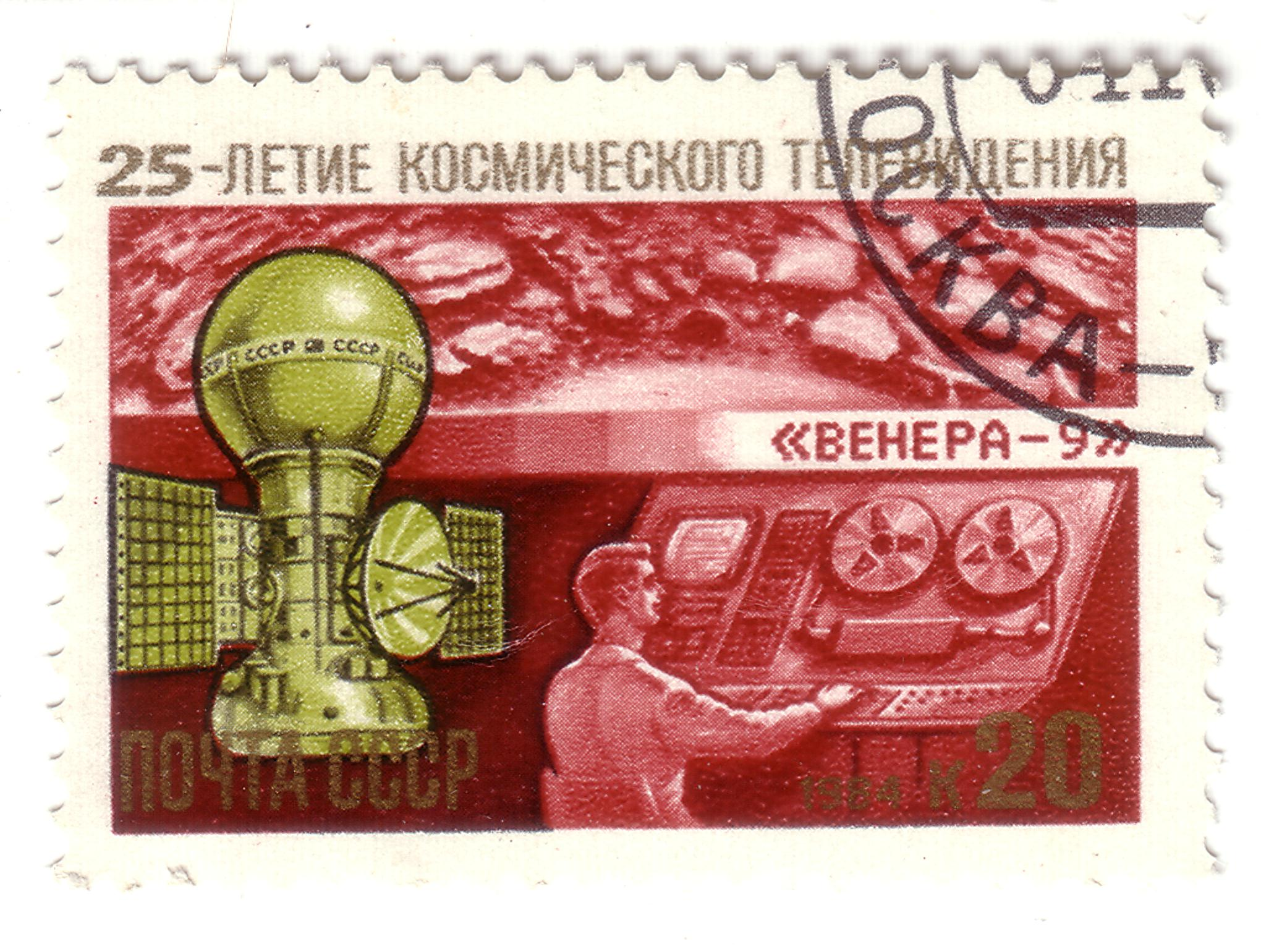
- Stamp of Venera 9 Venera

Venera 9 (Russian: Венера-9, lit. 'Venus-9'), manufacturer's designation: 4V-1 No. 660, was a Soviet uncrewed space mission to Venus. It consisted of an orbiter and a lander. It was launched on June 8, 1975, at 02:38:00 UTC and had a mass of 4,936 kilograms (10,882 lb). The orbiter was the first spacecraft to orbit Venus, while the lander was the first to return images from the surface of another planet.

== Orbiter ==
The orbiter entered Venus orbit on October 20, 1975. Its mission was to act as a communications relay for the lander and to explore cloud layers and atmospheric parameters with several instruments and experiments. It performed 17 survey missions from October 26, 1975, to December 25, 1975.

The orbiter consisted of a cylinder with two solar panel wings and a high gain parabolic antenna attached to the curved surface. A bell-shaped unit holding propulsion systems was attached to the bottom of the cylinder, and mounted on top was a 2.4-metre (7.9 ft) sphere which held the lander.

=== Orbiter design ===
The instruments composing the orbiter included:

- 1.6–2.8 μm IR spectrometer
- 8–28 μm IR radiometer
- 352 nm UV photometer
- 2 photo-polarimeters (335–800 nm)
- 300–800 nm spectrometer
- Lyman-α (alpha) H/D spectrometer
- Bistatic radar mapping
- CM, DM radio occultations
- Triaxial Magnetometer
- 345–380 nm UV camera
- 355–445 nm camera
- 6 electrostatic analyzers
- 2 modulation ion traps
- Low-energy proton / alpha detector
- Low-energy electron detector
- 3 semiconductor counters
- 2 gas-discharge counters
- Cherenkov detector

== Lander ==
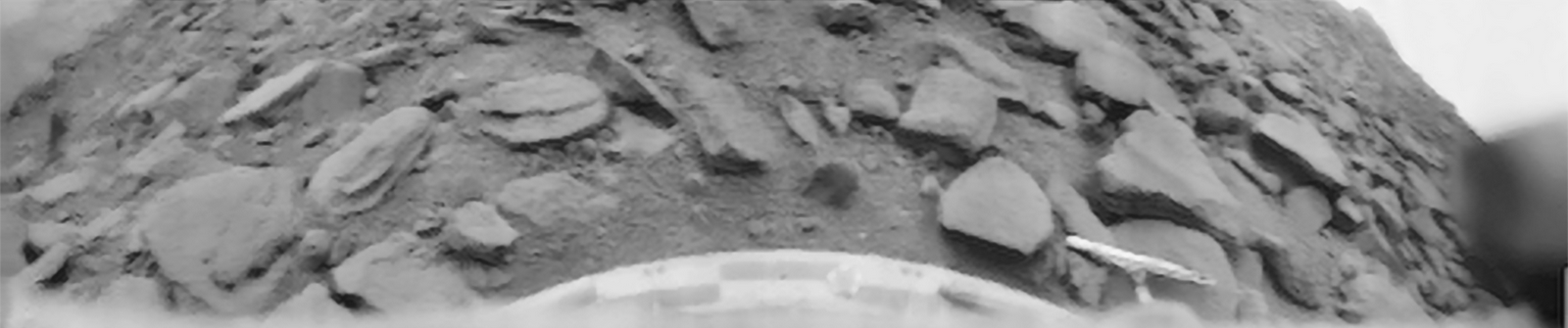
First view and clear image of the surface of Venus, taken by the Venera 9 lander on October 22, 1975

The lander was encased in a spherical shell before landing to help protect it from the heat of entry as it slowed from 10.7 kilometres per second (6.6 mi/s) to 150 metres per second (490 ft/s). This sphere was then separated with explosive bolts and a three-domed parachute was deployed which slowed the lander further to 50 metres per second (160 ft/s) at an altitude of 63 kilometres (39 mi) above the planet.

The descent through the cloud layer took about 20 minutes, during which time the lander took measurements of the atmosphere and radioed the information to the orbiter. To minimize lander damage in the hot atmosphere, the parachute was released at an altitude of 50 kilometres (31 mi), and the ring-shaped aerodynamic shield provided braking. The Venusian atmosphere is so dense near the surface that this shield provided a descent rate of 7 metres per second (23 ft/s) as the lander touched down. The landing device, a hollow ring surrounding the lower part of the lander, was partly crushed upon touchdown to take up most of the landing impact.

On October 20, 1975, the lander spacecraft separated from the orbiter, and landing was made with the Sun near zenith at 05:13 UTC on October 22. Venera 9 landed within a 150 km (93 mi) radius of 31.01°N 291.64°E, near Beta Regio, on a steep (20°) slope covered with boulders (suspected to be the slope of the tectonic rift valley, Aikhylu Chasma). The entry sphere weighed 1,560 kg (3,440 lb) and the surface payload was 660 kg (1,455 lb).

It was the first spacecraft to return an image from the surface of another planet. Many of the instruments began working immediately after touchdown and the cameras were operational 2 minutes later. These instruments revealed a smooth surface with numerous stones. The lander measured a light level of 14,000 lux, similar to that of Earth in full daylight but no direct sunshine.

A system of circulating fluid was used to distribute the heat load. This system, plus pre-cooling prior to entry, permitted operation of the lander for 53 minutes after landing, at which time radio contact with the orbiter was lost as the orbiter moved out of radio range. During descent, heat dissipation and deceleration were accomplished sequentially by protective hemispheric shells, three parachutes, a disc-shaped drag brake, and a compressible, metal, doughnut-shaped landing cushion. The landing was about 2,200 km (1,400 mi) from the Venera 10 landing site.

Venera 9 measured clouds that were 30–40 km (19–25 mi) thick, with bases at 30–35 km (19–22 mi) altitude. It also measured atmospheric chemicals including hydrochloric acid, hydrofluoric acid, bromine and iodine. Other measurements included surface pressure of about 9,100 kilopascals (90 atm), temperature of 485 °C (905 °F), and surface light levels comparable to those at Earth mid-latitudes on a cloudy summer day. Venera 9 was the first probe to send back television pictures (black and white) from the Venusian surface, showing no shadows, no apparent dust in the air, and a variety of 30 to 40 cm (12 to 16 in) rocks which were not eroded. Planned 360-degree panoramic pictures could not be taken because one of two camera lens covers failed to come off, limiting pictures to 180 degrees. This failure recurred with Venera 10.

=== Lander payload ===
The lander payload was as follows:

- Temperature and pressure sensors
- Accelerometer
- Visible / IR photometer – IOV-75
- Backscatter and multi-angle nephelometers – MNV-75
- P-11 mass spectrometer – MAV-75
- Panoramic telephotometers (2, with lamps)
- Anemometer – ISV-75
- Gamma-ray spectrometer – GS-12V
- Gamma-ray densitometer – RP-75

== See also ==
- List of missions to Venus
- Timeline of artificial satellites and space probes
