= Venera 14 =

1982 Soviet space probe which successfully landed on Venus

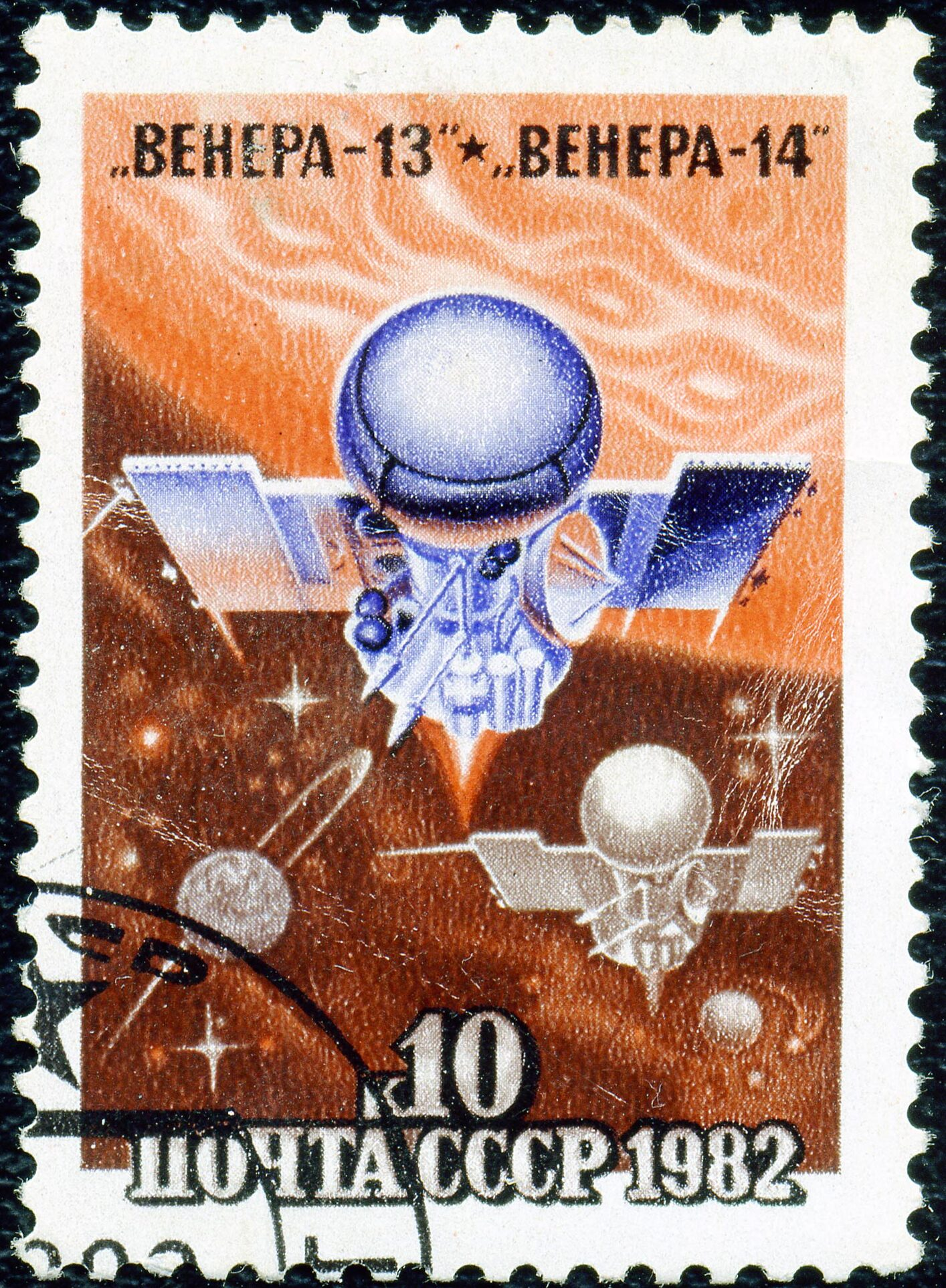
- Venera 14 postage stamp
- Mission type: Venus flyby / lander
- Operator: Soviet Academy of Sciences
- COSPAR ID: 1981-110A; 1981-110D
- SATCAT no.: 12939; 15600
- Mission duration: Travel: 4 months and 1 day Lander: 57 minutes

Spacecraft properties
- Spacecraft type: 4V-1 No. 761
- Manufacturer: NPO Lavochkin
- Launch mass: 4,394.5 kg (9,688 lb)
- Landing mass: 760 kilograms (1,680 lb)
- Dry mass: 1,632.71 kilograms (3,599.5 lb)
- Dimensions: 2.7 m × 2.3 m × 5.7 m (8.9 ft × 7.5 ft × 18.7 ft)

Start of mission
- Launch date: 4 November 1981, 05:31:00 UTC
- Rocket: Proton-K/D-1
- Launch site: Baikonur 200/39

End of mission
- Last contact: lander: 5 March 1982 / carrier: 9 April 1983

Orbital parameters
- Reference system: Heliocentric
- Eccentricity: 0.17
- Perihelion altitude: 0.71 Astronomical units
- Aphelion altitude: 0.99 Astronomical units
- Inclination: 2.3 degrees
- Period: 286 days

Flyby of Venus
- Spacecraft component: Venera 14 flight platform
- Closest approach: March 3, 1982
- Distance: 26,050 km (16,190 mi)

Venus lander
- Spacecraft component: Venera 14 descent craft
- Landing date: March 5, 1982, 07:00:10 UTC
- Landing site: 13.25°S 310°E (east of Phoebe Regio)

Venera 14 was a probe in the Soviet Venera program for the exploration of Venus.

Venera 14 was identical to the Venera 13 spacecraft, built to take advantage of the 1981 Venus launch opportunity. Venera 14 was launched on 4 November 1981 at 05:31:00 UTC, five days after Venera 13 launched on 30 October 1981 at 06:04:00 UTC. Both had an on-orbit dry mass of 760 kg (1,680 lb).

== Design ==
Each mission consisted of a cruise stage and an attached descent craft.

=== Cruise stage ===
As the cruise stage flew by Venus, the bus acted as a data relay for the lander before continuing on to a heliocentric orbit. Venera 14 was equipped with a gamma-ray spectrometer, UV grating monochromator, electron and proton spectrometers, gamma-ray burst detectors, solar wind plasma detectors, and two-frequency transmitters which made measurements before, during, and after the Venus flyby.

=== Descent lander ===
The descent lander was a hermetically sealed pressure vessel that contained most of the instrumentation and electronics. The lander was mounted on a ring-shaped landing platform and topped by an antenna. Designed similar to the earlier Venera 9–12 landers, the Venera 14 lander carried instruments to take chemical and isotopic measurements, monitor the spectrum of scattered sunlight, and record electric discharges during its descent phase through the Venusian atmosphere. The spacecraft used a camera system, an X-ray fluorescence spectrometer, a screw drill and surface sampler, a dynamic penetrometer, and a seismometer to conduct investigations on the surface.

The list of lander experiments and instruments include:

- Accelerometer, Impact analysis – Bison-M
- Thermometers, Barometers – ITD
- Spectrometer / Directional Photometer – IOAV-2
- Ultraviolet Photometer
- Mass spectrometer – MKh-6411
- Penetrometer / Soil ohmmeter – PrOP-V
- Chemical Redox indicator – Kontrast
- 2 color telephotometer cameras – TFZL-077
- Gas chromatograph – Sigma-2
- Radio / Microphone / Seismometer – Groza-2
- Nephelometer – MNV-78-2
- Hydrometer – VM-3R
- X-Ray Fluorescence Spectrometer (Aerosol) – BDRA-1V
- X-Ray Fluorescence Spectrometer (Soil) – Arakhis-2
- Soil Drilling Apparatus – GZU VB-02
- Stabilized Oscillator / Doppler Radio
- Small solar batteries – MSB

== Landing ==
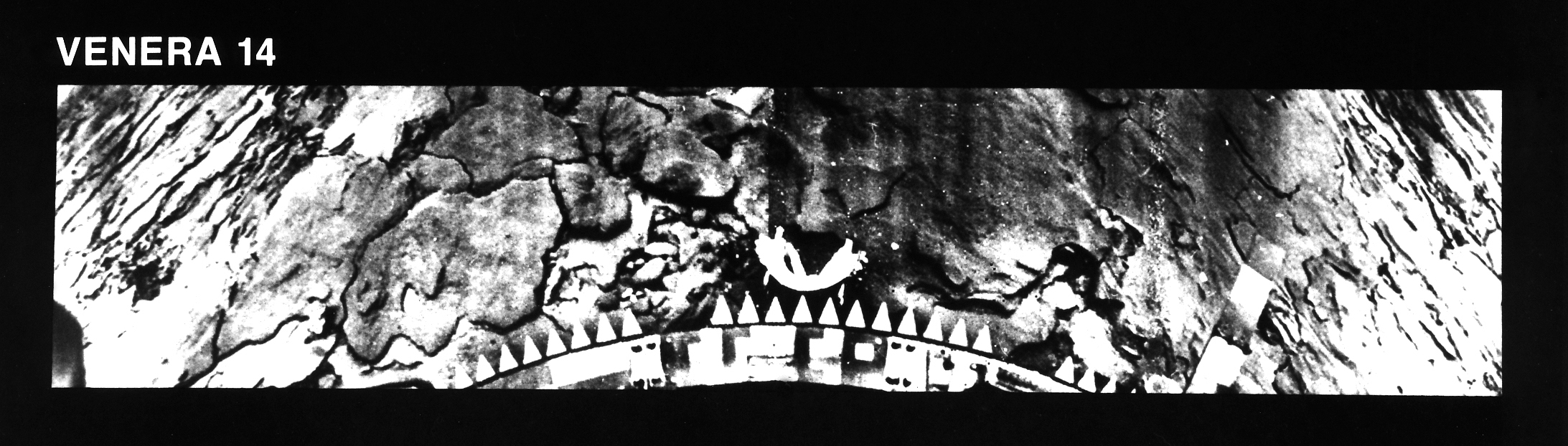
Panoramic view of the surface Venus from the Soviet Venera 14 spacecraft

Venera 14 landed at 13.25°S 310°E, about 950 kilometres (590 mi) southwest of Venera 13, near the eastern flank of Phoebe Regio on a basaltic plain.

After launch and following a four-month cruise to Venus, the descent vehicle separated from the bus and plunged into the Venusian atmosphere on 5 March 1982. A parachute deployed after the lander entered the atmosphere. The parachute released once the lander reached an altitude of about 50 kilometres (31 mi); simple air braking was used in the final descent.

Like its predecessors, Venera 14 was equipped with several systems with which to observe and analyse the Venusian surface and atmosphere.

The quartz camera windows were protected by lens covers that popped off after descent, allowing Venera 14 to capture images of the surface.

The Venera 14 lander was also equipped with a surface soil probe designed to measure the compressibility of the Venusian soil. By unfortunate chance, the lens caps came to rest at the exact point the probe was due to enter and analyse the soil. Thus, instead of the soil, the probe measured the compressibility of the Venera 14 lens cap.

The surface soil composition samples were determined by the X-ray fluorescence spectrometer, and were shown to be similar to oceanic tholeiitic basalts.

Additionally, Venera 14 was equipped with acoustic microphones designed to record atmospheric noise. The recordings were later used to calculate the average wind speed on the Venusian surface. Subsequent analysis determined the average surface wind speed to be between 0.3 and 0.5 metres per second (0.98 and 1.64 ft/s).

The Venera 14 lander functioned for at least 57 minutes (the lander's planned lifespan was 32 minutes) in an environment with a temperature of 465 °C (869 °F) and a pressure of 94 Earth atmospheres (9.5 MPa). Telemetry was maintained by means of the Venera 14 bus in orbit, which carried signals from the lander's uplink antenna and then on to Earth.

== Post encounter ==
The spacecraft bus ended up in a heliocentric orbit where it continued to make observations in the X-ray and gamma ray spectrum. The bus activated its engine on 14 November 1982 to provide data for later Vega program missions. The last published data for the probe is dated 16 March 1983.

== Fictional references ==
- Venera 14 is visited by a Russian cosmonaut in BBC's Space Odyssey: Voyage To The Planets.

== Image processing ==
American researcher Don P. Mitchell has processed the color images from Venera 13 and 14 using the raw original data. The new images are based on a more accurate linearization of the original 9-bit logarithmic pixel encoding.

== See also ==
- List of missions to Venus
