= Penetrometer =

Device to test material strength

A penetrometer is a device to test the strength of a material.

== Soil ==
There are many types of penetrometer designed to be used on soil. They are usually round or cone shaped. The penetrometer is dropped on the test subject or pressed against it and the depth of the resulting hole is measured. The measurements find whether the soil is strong enough to build a road on. Scientists also use a penetrometer to measure how much moisture is in soil. Penetrometers are used by space probes such as the Cassini–Huygens probe, to measure the amount of moisture in soil on other planets. Penetrometers are furthermore used in glaciology to measure the strength and nature of materials underlying a glacier at its bed.

A penetrometer is also used in longer professional cricket matches, to measure how the pitch is holding up over the course of a multi-day match.

British horse racing courses have been required, since 2009, to report the readings obtained using a penetrometer, on each day of a race meeting.

== Ceramic industry ==
In the ceramic industry, soil penetrometers, often adapted as pocket penetrometers, are a tool for the empirical measurement of "workability" or consistency in plastic clay bodies to monitor batches are of the correct level of moisture content and stiffness for specific forming processes, such as extrusion or jiggering. By pressing the calibrated spring-loaded plunger into a prepared clay body sample, the operator can obtain a quantitative reading of the material's resistance to deformation, which helps in maintaining batch-to-batch uniformity that manual "thumb tests" cannot provide. This characterisation is particularly crucial in industrial settings where the moisture content must be precisely controlled to prevent warping or cracking during the subsequent drying.

== Botany ==
A penetrometer may be used in botany to find the toughness of a leaf by measuring the force needed to punch a hole of a certain size through the leaf.

Penetrometers are also used to measure the firmness of apples and other hard fruit.

== Science ==
Penetrometers equipped with a known needle and mass are used to determine the hardness of bitumen and thus its efficacy and material properties when applied to roads as asphalt concrete.

== Food products ==
Penetrometers are used for objective evaluation of food products. Penetrometers, equipped with a plunger and a needle or cone, penetrate food samples through gravitational force for a selected period of time. The distance the test device penetrates into the sample is measured to determine the relative tenderness of the samples such as baked products and gels.
