= Transmissometer =

Meteorological instrumentation

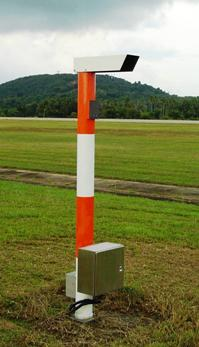
Transmissometer providing Runway Visual Range information

A transmissometer or transmissiometer is an instrument for measuring the extinction coefficient of the atmosphere and sea water, and for the determination of visual range. It operates by sending a narrow, collimated beam of energy (usually a laser) through the propagation medium. A narrow field of view receiver at the designated measurement distance determines how much energy is arriving at the detector, and determines the path transmission and/or extinction coefficient. In a transmissometer the extinction coefficient is determined by measuring direct light transmissivity, and the extinction coefficient is then used to calculate visibility range.

Atmospheric extinction is a wavelength dependent phenomenon, but the most common wavelength in use for transmissometers is 550 nm, which is in the middle of the visible waveband, and allows a good approximation of visual range.

Transmissometers are also referred to as telephotometers, transmittance meters, or hazemeters.

Transmissometers are also used by oceanographers and limnologists to measure the optical properties of natural water. In this context, a transmissometer measures the transmittance or attenuation of incident radiation from a light source with a wavelength of around 660 nm, generally through a shorter distance than in air, as water has a smaller maximum visibility distance.

== EMOR - Extended MOR Technology ==
Latest generation transmissometer technology makes use of a co-located forward scatter visibility sensor on the transmitter unit to allow for higher accuracies over an Extended Meteorological Optical Range or EMOR. After 10,000 meters the accuracy of transmissometer technology diminishes, and at higher visibilities forward scatter visibility sensor technology is more accurate. The co-location of the two sensors allows for the most accurate technology to be used when reporting current visibility. The forward scatter sensor also enables auto-alignment and auto-calibration of the transmissometer device. Hence it is very useful for oceanography and water optics study.

== See also ==
- Index of aviation articles
- Weather radar
- Runway visual range
