= KTDU-425 =

Former Soviet rocket engine

KTDU-425 (11D425)
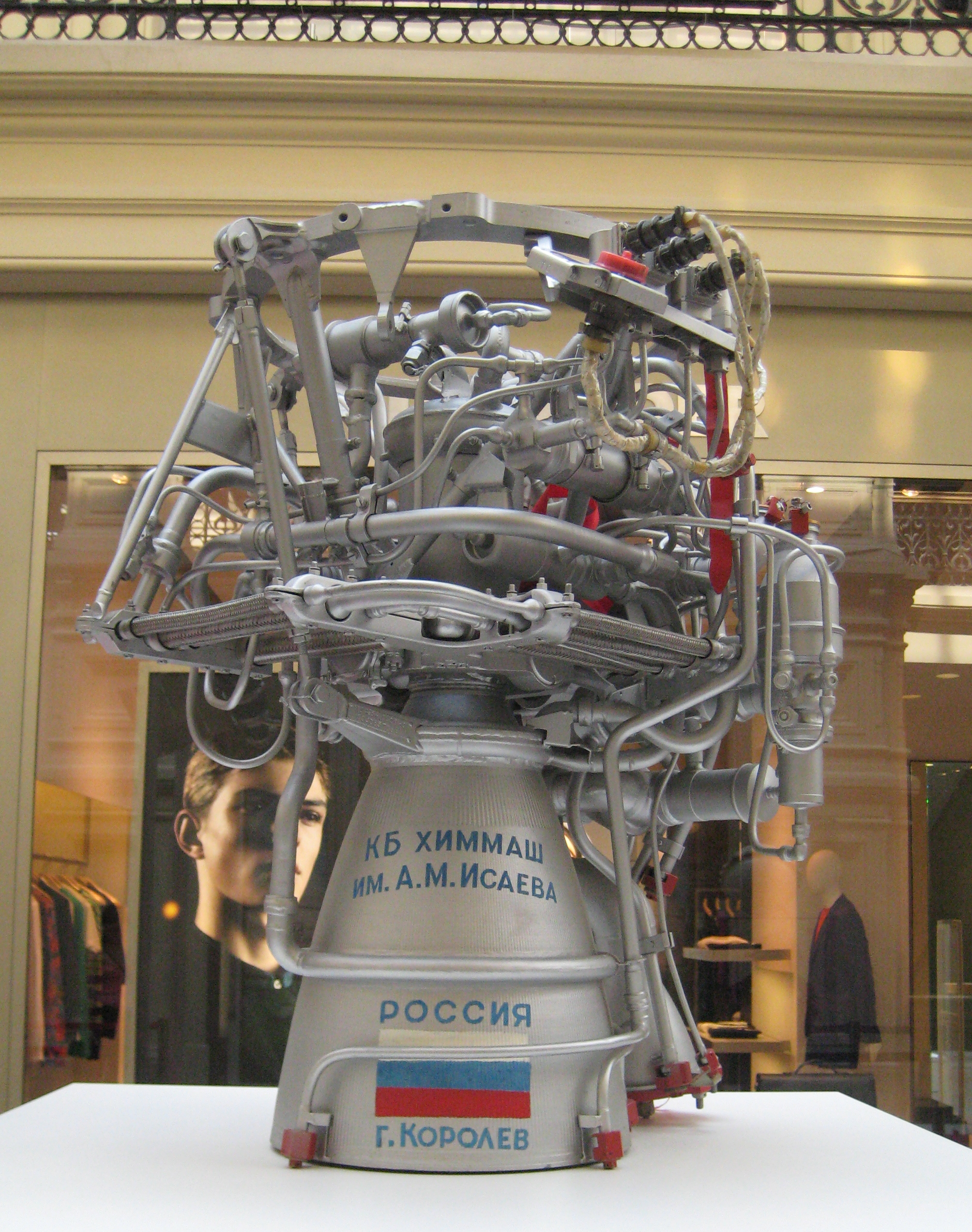
- KTDU-425A at the Cosmos exhibition, GUM, Moscow
- Country of origin: Soviet Union
- Designer: Aleksei Isaev
- Manufacturer: Isayev Design Bureau
- Status: Retired; Propellent: UDMH/N_{2}O_{4}

Performance
- Thrust, vacuum: 18.85 kN (KTDU-425) 18.89 kN (KTDU-425A)

Used in
- Mars 2-7, Venera 9-16 Vega 1,2; Astron, Granat Phobos 1,2

The KTDU-425 was a former Soviet liquid-fueled engine designed Aleksei Isaev of the Isayev Design Bureau. It was mainly used on the 4MV bus, which employed it as its main propulsion system. The first version which was the KTDU-425 (11D425), which had a thrust of 18.85kN was first used in 1971 for Mars-2, Mars-3 as well as the failed M-71C (Kosmos 419) probe. This was soon replaced by the KTDU-425A, which had a thrust of 18.89kN. This version was employed on the remaining 4MV and 5VK probes built, as well as Phobos 1 and 2.

== Variants ==
- KTDU-425 (11D425) - First version of the KTDU-425. Employed in 1971 on M-71 Probes. Thrust: 18.85Kn, Specific Impulse: 312s, Burn time: 520s.
- KTDU-425A (11D425A) - Improved version of KTDU-425. Employed between 1973 and 1989. Thrust 18.89Kn, Specific Impulse: 315s, Burn time: 560s.
