= Mars 5 =

Soviet orbiter mission to Mars (1973–1974)

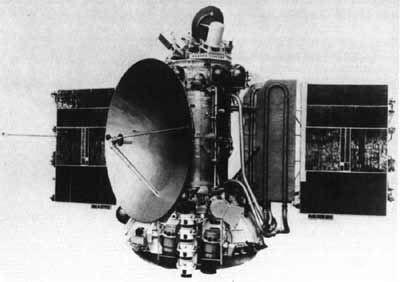
- Mission type: Mars orbiter
- Operator: Soviet space program
- COSPAR ID: 1973-049A
- SATCAT no.: 6754
- Mission duration: 7 months, 3 days

Spacecraft properties
- Spacecraft: 3MS No.53S
- Manufacturer: NPO Lavochkin
- Launch mass: 3,440 kg (7,580 lb)

Start of mission
- Launch date: 25 July 1973, 18:55:48 UTC
- Rocket: Proton-K/D
- Launch site: Baikonur 81/24
- Contractor: Khrunichev

End of mission
- Last contact: 28 February 1974

Orbital parameters
- Reference system: Areocentric
- Periareon altitude: 1,760 kilometres (1,090 mi)
- Apoareon altitude: 32,586 kilometres (20,248 mi)
- Inclination: 35.3°
- Period: 24.88 hours
- Epoch: 12 February 1974

Mars orbiter
- Orbital insertion: 12 February 1974, 15:45 UTC

Mars 5 (Russian: Марс-5), also known as 3MS No.53S was a Soviet spacecraft launched to explore Mars. A 3MS spacecraft launched as part of the Mars programme, it successfully entered orbit around Mars in 1974. However, it failed a few weeks later.

== Spacecraft ==
The Mars 5 spacecraft carried an array of instruments to study Mars. In addition to cameras, it was equipped with a radio telescope, an IR radiometer, multiple photometers, polarimeters, a magnetometer, plasma traps, an electrostatic analyser, a gamma-ray spectrometer, and a radio probe. The Three cameras were a 52mm Vega, a 350mm Zulfar and a panoramic camera.

Built by Lavochkin, Mars 5 was the second of two 3MS spacecraft launched to Mars in 1973, following Mars 4. A 3MS was also launched during the 1971 launch window as Kosmos 419. However, due to a launch failure, it failed to depart Earth orbit. In addition to the orbiters, two 3MP lander missions, Mars 6 and Mars 7, were launched during the 1973 window.

== Launch ==
Mars 5 was launched by a Proton-K carrier rocket with a Blok D upper stage, flying from Baikonur Cosmodrome Site 81/24. The launch occurred at 18:55:48 UTC on 25 July 1973, with the first three stages placing the spacecraft and upper stage into a low Earth parking orbit before the Blok D fired to propel Mars 5 into heliocentric orbit bound for Mars.

The spacecraft performed course correction manoeuvres on 3 August 1973 and 2 February 1974.

== Mars orbit ==
The probe reached Mars on 12 February 1974. At 14:44:25 the spacecraft's engines ignited to begin its orbit insertion burn, which successfully placed it into an Areocentric orbit with a periapsis of 1,760 kilometres (1,090 mi), an apoapsis of 32,586 kilometres (20,248 mi), and 35.3 degrees inclination.

The spacecraft's pressurised instrument compartment began to leak as soon as the spacecraft entered orbit around Mars, which controllers believed to be the result of a micrometeoroid impact during orbital insertion. It ceased operations on 28 February, having returned 180 photographic frames, 43 of which were of usable quality. The probe's original planned lifetime in Mars orbit had been three months. The probe's gamma ray spectrometer measured the uranium, thorium and potassium content of the surface the probe passed over and found they were similar to igneous rocks on Earth. The exact ratios of the elements varied with the age of the surface. Mars 5's Infrared radiometer reported a daytime surface temperature of between −44 and −2 °C (−47 and 28 °F). Night time temperatures were measured at −73 °C (−99 °F).

The probe also made a number of observations of Mars's atmosphere. It found an ozone layer at an altitude of 30 kilometres (19 mi) and observed clouds.

== See also ==
- List of missions to Mars
- List of Mars orbiters
- Timeline of artificial satellites and space probes
