= Mars 4 =

Failed Soviet orbiter mission to Mars (1973–1974)

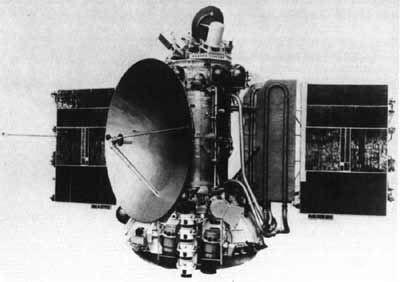
- Mission type: Mars orbiter
- Operator: Soviet space program
- COSPAR ID: 1973-047A
- SATCAT no.: 6742
- Mission duration: 203 days, 20 hours and 7 minutes

Spacecraft properties
- Spacecraft: 3MS No.52S
- Manufacturer: NPO Lavochkin
- Launch mass: 3,440 kg (7,580 lb)

Start of mission
- Launch date: 21 July 1973, 19:30:59 UTC
- Rocket: Proton-K/D
- Launch site: Baikonur 81/23
- Contractor: Khrunichev

End of mission
- Last contact: 10 February 1974, 15:38 UTC

Orbital parameters
- Reference system: Heliocentric
- Perihelion altitude: 1.02 AU
- Aphelion altitude: 1.63 AU
- Inclination: 2.2°
- Period: 556 days

Flyby of Mars (failed orbiter)
- Closest approach: 10 February 1974, 15:34 UTC
- Distance: 1,844 km (1,146 mi)

Mars 4 (Russian: Марс-4), also known as 3MS No.52S was a Soviet spacecraft intended to explore Mars. A 3MS spacecraft launched as part of the Mars programme, it was intended to enter orbit around Mars in 1974. However, computer problems prevented orbital insertion from occurring.

== Spacecraft ==
The Mars 4 spacecraft carried an array of instruments to study Mars. In addition to cameras, it was equipped with a radio telescope, an IR radiometer, multiple photometers, polarimeters, a magnetometer, plasma traps, an electrostatic analyzer, a gamma-ray spectrometer, and a radio probe.

Built by Lavochkin, Mars 4 was the first of two 3MS spacecraft launched to Mars in 1973, being followed by Mars 5. A 3MS was also launched during the 1971 launch window as Kosmos 419. However, due to a launch failure, it failed to depart Earth orbit. In addition to the orbiters, two 3MP lander missions, Mars 6 and Mars 7, were launched during the 1973 window.

== Launch ==
Mars 4 was launched by a Proton-K carrier rocket, a Blok D upper stage, flying from Baikonur Cosmodrome Site 81/23. The launch occurred at 19:30:59 UTC on 21 July 1973, with the first three stages placing the spacecraft and upper stage into a low Earth parking orbit before the Blok D fired to propel Mars 4 into heliocentric orbit bound for Mars.

Shortly after performing a course correction on 30 July 1973, two onboard computers failed, leaving Mars 4 unable to perform maneuvers. As a result of this, it was unable to enter orbit around Mars. Twelve photographs were taken on 10 February 1974 from 15:32 UTC to 15:38 UTC as the probe flew past Mars with a closest approach of 1,844 kilometres (1,146 mi) at 15:34 UTC.

== Scientific Instruments ==
Mars 4 orbiter carried 15 scientific instruments on board to study Mars from orbital trajectory

- Atmospheric Radio-probing Instrument
- Radio Telescope
- Infrared Radiometer
- Spectrophotometer
- Narrow-band Photometer
- Narrow-band Interference-Polarization Photometer
- Imaging System
- Photometers
- Two Polarimeters
- Ultraviolet Photometer
- Scattered Solar Radiation Photometer
- Gamma Spectrometer
- Magnetometer
- Plasma Traps
- Multichannel Electrostatic Analyzer

== See also ==
- List of missions to Mars
- Timeline of artificial satellites and space probes
