= Mars 6 =

Soviet flyby/lander mission to Mars (1973–1974)

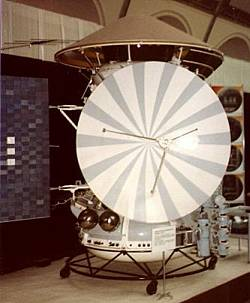
- Mission type: Mars flyby/lander
- Operator: Soviet space program
- COSPAR ID: 1973-052A; 1973-052E
- SATCAT no.: 6768; 7223
- Mission duration: 218 days, 15 hours and 25 minutes

Spacecraft properties
- Spacecraft: 3MP No.50P
- Manufacturer: NPO Lavochkin
- Launch mass: 3,260 kg (7,190 lb)
- Landing mass: 635 kg (1,400 lb)

Start of mission
- Launch date: 5 August 1973, 17:45:48 UTC
- Rocket: Proton-K/D
- Launch site: Baikonur 81/23
- Contractor: Khrunichev

End of mission
- Last contact: Lander: 12 March 1974, 09:11:05 UTC

Orbital parameters
- Reference system: Heliocentric
- Perihelion altitude: 1.01 AU
- Aphelion altitude: 1.67 AU
- Inclination: 2.2°
- Period: 567 days

Flyby of Mars
- Spacecraft component: Bus
- Closest approach: 12 March 1974, 09:05:53 UTC
- Distance: 1,600 km (990 mi)

Mars impact (failed landing)
- Spacecraft component: Lander
- Impact date: 12 March 1974, 09:11 UTC
- Impact site: 23.90°S 19.42°W

Mars 6 (Russian: Марс-6), also known as 3MP No.50P was a Soviet spacecraft launched to explore Mars. A 3MP bus spacecraft launched as part of the Mars program, it consisted of a lander, and a coast stage with instruments to study Mars as it flew past.

== Spacecraft ==
The Mars 6 spacecraft carried an array of instruments to study Mars. The lander was equipped with a thermometer and barometer to determine the surface conditions, an accelerometer and radio altimeter for descent, and instruments to analyse the surface material including a mass spectrometer. The coast stage, or bus, carried a magnetometer, plasma traps, cosmic ray and micrometeoroid detectors, and an instrument to study proton and electron fluxes from the Sun.

Built by Lavochkin, Mars 6 was the first of two 3MP spacecraft launched to Mars in 1973 and was followed by Mars 7. Two orbiters, Mars 4 and Mars 5, were launched earlier in the 1973 Mars launch window and were expected to relay data for the two landers. However, Mars 4 failed to enter orbit, and Mars 5 failed after a few days in orbit.

== Launch ==
Mars 6 was launched by a Proton-K carrier rocket with a Blok D upper stage, flying from Baikonur Cosmodrome Site 81/23. The launch occurred at 17:45:48 UTC on 5 August 1973, with the first three stages placing the spacecraft and upper stage into a low Earth parking orbit before the Blok D fired to propel Mars 6 into heliocentric orbit bound for Mars. The spacecraft performed a course correction on 13 August 1973.

Mars 6's lander separated from the flyby bus on 12 March 1974 at an altitude of 48,000 kilometres (30,000 mi) from the surface of Mars. The bus made a flyby with a closest approach of 1,600 kilometres (990 mi). The lander encountered the atmosphere of Mars at 09:05:53 UTC, slowing from 5,600 to 600 metres per second (12,500 to 1,300 mph) as it passed through the upper atmosphere. A parachute was then deployed to further slow the probe's descent, and retrorockets were intended to fire during the last seconds before the probe reached the ground.

The spacecraft returned data for 224 seconds during its descent through the Martian atmosphere. However, at 09:11:05 UTC, with the spacecraft about to fire its retrorockets in preparation for landing, all contact was lost. Due to a design flaw, a chip aboard the spacecraft had degraded during the mission, and a large amount of the data which had been returned was unusable.

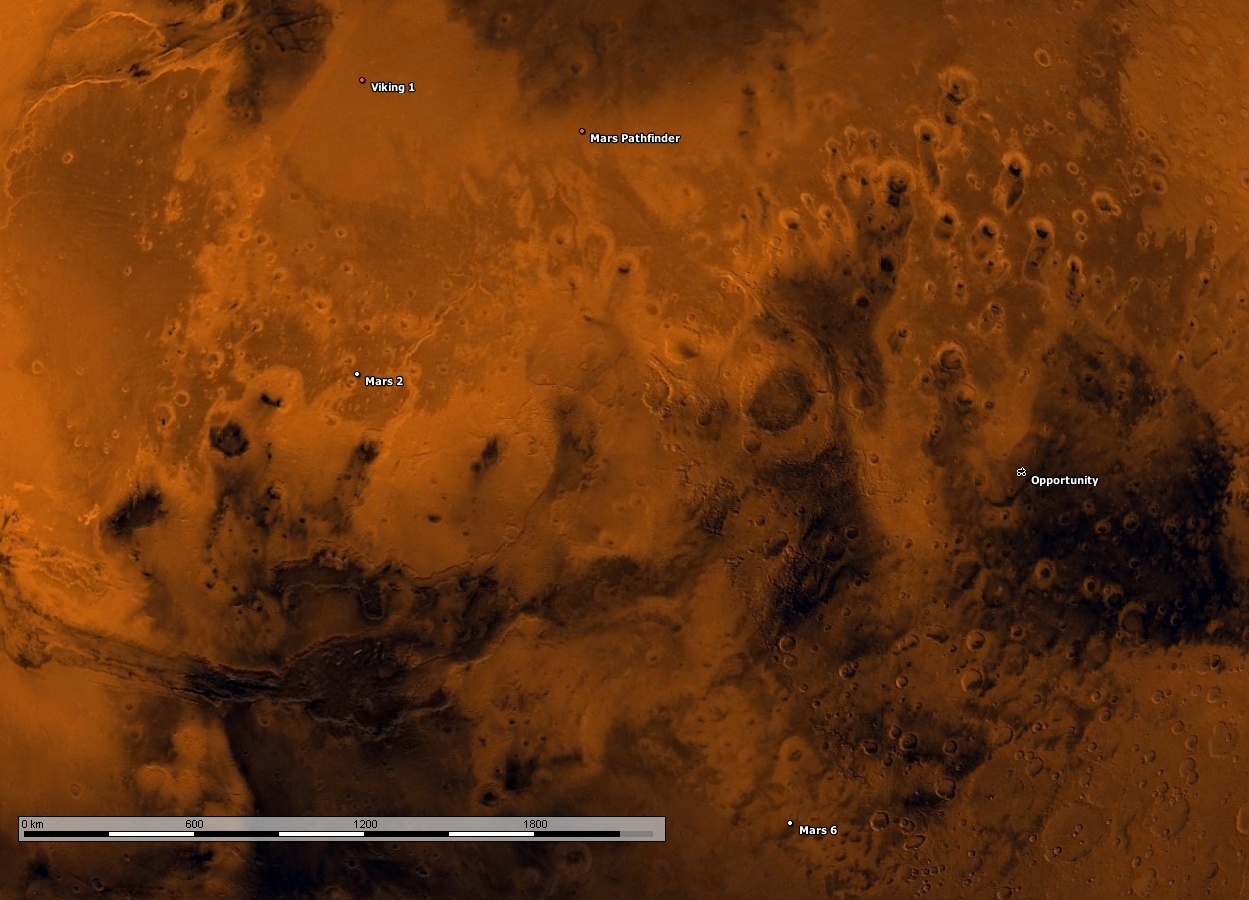
Map of the planet Mars, showing the locations of Viking 1, Mars 2, Mars Pathfinder, Opportunity and Mars 6 (lower centre of the image, near the scale bar).

== See also ==
- List of artificial objects on Mars
- List of missions to Mars
- Timeline of artificial satellites and space probes
