= Mars 7 =

Failed Soviet flyby/lander mission to Mars (1973–1974)

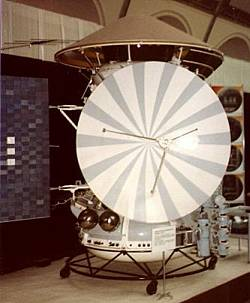
- Mission type: Mars flyby/lander
- Operator: Soviet space program
- COSPAR ID: 1973-053A; 1973-053E
- SATCAT no.: 6776; 7224
- Mission duration: 7 months, 16 days

Spacecraft properties
- Spacecraft: 3MP No.51P
- Manufacturer: NPO Lavochkin
- Launch mass: 3,260 kg (7,190 lb)
- Landing mass: 635 kg (1,400 lb)

Start of mission
- Launch date: 9 August 1973, 17:00:17 UTC
- Rocket: Proton-K/D
- Launch site: Baikonur 81/24
- Contractor: Khrunichev

End of mission
- Last contact: 25 March 1974

Orbital parameters
- Reference system: Heliocentric

Flyby of Mars
- Spacecraft component: Bus
- Closest approach: 9 March 1974

Mars flyby (failed landing)
- Spacecraft component: Lander
- Closest approach: 9 March 1974
- Distance: 1,300 km (810 mi)

Mars 7 (Russian: Марс-7), also known as 3MP No.51P was a Soviet spacecraft launched in 1973 to explore Mars. A 3MP bus spacecraft which comprised the final mission of the Mars programme, it consisted of a lander and a coast stage with instruments to study Mars as it flew past. Due to a malfunction, the lander failed to perform a maneuver necessary to enter the Martian atmosphere, missing the planet and remaining in heliocentric orbit along with the coast stage.

== Spacecraft ==
Mars 7 spacecraft carried an array of instruments to study Mars. The lander was equipped with a thermometer and barometer to determine the surface conditions, an accelerometer and radio altimeter for descent, and instruments to analyse the surface material including a mass spectrometer. The coast stage, or bus, carried a magnetometer, plasma traps, cosmic ray and micrometeoroid detectors, stereo antennae, and an instrument to study proton and electron fluxes from the Sun.

Built by Lavochkin, Mars 7 was the second of two 3MP spacecraft launched to Mars in 1973, having been preceded by Mars 6. Two orbiters, Mars 4 and Mars 5, were launched earlier in the 1973 Mars launch window and were expected to relay data for the two landers. However, Mars 4 failed to enter orbit, and Mars 5 failed after a few days in orbit.

== Launch ==
Mars 7 was launched by a Proton-K carrier rocket with a Blok D upper stage, flying from Baikonur Cosmodrome Site 81/24. The launch occurred at 17:00:17 UTC on 9 August 1973, with the first three stages placing the spacecraft and upper stage into a low Earth parking orbit before the Blok D fired to propel Mars 7 into heliocentric orbit bound for Mars. The spacecraft performed a course correction on 16 August 1973.

Mars 7's lander separated from the flyby bus on 9 March 1974. Initially, it failed to separate. However, it was eventually released to begin its descent. Due to a retrorocket failure, the probe missed the atmosphere of Mars, and, instead of landing, flew past along with the coast stage, with a closest approach of 1,300 km (810 mi). Known faults with the spacecraft's transistors were blamed for the failure, along with that of Mars 4.

== See also ==
- List of missions to Mars
- Timeline of artificial satellites and space probes
