= 4MV =

Design used for Soviet space probes to Mars and Venus

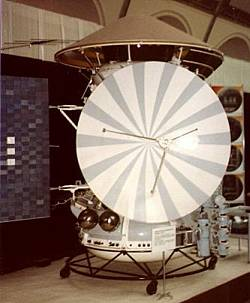
- Mars-6, a 3MP version of the 4MV bus.
- Manufacturer: NPO Lavochkin
- Country of origin: Soviet Union
- Operator: Soviet Space Program

Specifications
- Power: 2 Solar arrays (Mars, Venera); 4 Solar arrays (Astron, Granat)

Production
- Operational: 1971-1989 Engines: 1 KTDU-425 (Mars 2-3) 1 KTDU-425A (Post 1971) Fuel: UDMH/N_{2}O_{4}

The 4MV planetary probe (short for 4th-generation Mars-Venus probe) is a designation for a common design used for Soviet unmanned probes to Mars and Venus.

It was an incremental improvement of earlier 3MV probes and was used for Mars missions 2 to 7 and Venera missions 9 to 16. Different versions of the bus exist, for example 4V-1, 4V-M and 4V-2. The same base design was also used for earth-orbiting space observatories.

== Design ==
The spacecraft bus has a height of 2.8 meters (9 ft 2 in) and a solar panel span of 6.7 meters (22 ft). The central section of the bus has a diameter of about one meter (3 ft 3 in) and contained propellant. The main engine (KTDU-425) is encircled by a conical instrument compartment with the diameter of 2.35 meters (7 ft 9 in) at the base. While Mars 2,3 and Kosmos 419 used the KTDU-425, 4MV buses after 1971 used the KTDU-425A).

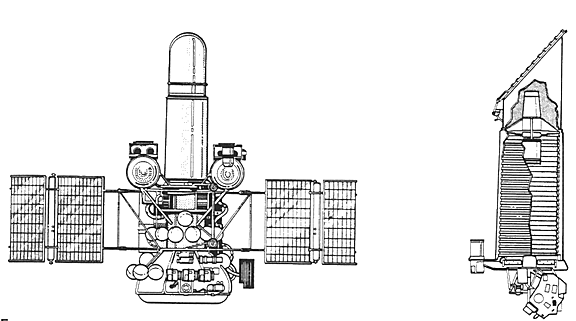
Astron

== Variants ==
- Mars M-71|3MS: Kosmos 419 (M-71|3MS No.170), Mars 2 (M-71 No.171), Mars 3 (M-71 No.172)
- Mars M-73|3MS|3MP: Mars 4 (M-73|3MS No.52S), Mars 5 (M-73|3MS No.53S), Mars 6 (M-73|3MP No.50P), Mars 7 (M-73|3MP No.51P)
- Venera 4V-1: Venera 9 (4V-1 No.660), Venera 10 (4V-1 No.661), Venera 11 (4V-1 No.360), Venera 12 (4V-1 No.361), Venera 13 (4V-1M No.760), Venera 14 (4V-1M No.761)
- Astron: Astron
- Venera 4V-2: Venera 15 (4V-2 No.860), Venera 16 (4V-2 No.861)
- Granat: Granat

== See also ==
- Soviet space program
- M-69
- Venera
- 3MV
