= Mars 2M No.521 =

Soviet Mars probe

2M No.521
- Mission type: Mars orbiter
- Mission duration: Failed to orbit

Spacecraft properties
- Spacecraft type: 2M
- Manufacturer: NPO Lavochkin
- Launch mass: 4,850 kg (10,690 lb)

Start of mission
- Launch date: March 27, 1969, 10:40:45 UTC
- Rocket: Proton-K/D s/n 240-01
- Launch site: Baikonur 81/23

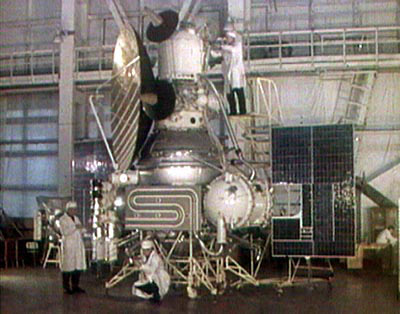
Verification of systems unit (Mars 1969A)

Mars 2M No.521, also known as Mars M-69 No.521 and sometimes identified by NASA as Mars 1969A, was a Soviet spacecraft which was lost in a launch failure in 1969. It consisted of an orbiter. The spacecraft was intended to image the surface of Mars using three cameras, with images being encoded for transmission back to Earth as television signals. It also carried a radiometer, a series of spectrometers, and an instrument to detect water vapour in the atmosphere of Mars. It was one of two Mars 2M spacecraft, along with Mars 2M No.522, which was launched in 1969 as part of the Mars programme. Neither launch was successful.

The Mars 2M probes were originally intended to consist of both an orbiter and a lander. Time constraints did not permit the development of a soft lander, so engineers decided to simply use a hard lander that would crash into the Martian surface but gather data during its descent. At first, a modified Luna E-8 bus was to be used for the spacecraft, however it had a number of limitations that made it unsuitable for the long journey to Mars. Halfway through the project, Lavochkin Bureau design chief Georgi Babakin decided to simply discard the Luna E-8 derived probe and design a completely new one from scratch.

However, the 2M probes ended significantly heavier than intended and engineers also ran out of time to conduct drop tests of the lander, so that part was abandoned which left only the orbiter. If successful, this would still be a major propaganda success for the Soviets as NASA was nearly three years away from attempting a Mars orbiter.

As 1968 drew to a close, the project was lagging behind schedule and the US was also making significant headway in the space race with Mariner 6 and 7 scheduled to launch to Mars early in the next year and Apollo 8 taking astronauts into lunar orbit. The Kremlin wanted the Mars probes readied as soon as possible and the second of the two probes was completed in the middle of January. Despite doubts that the probes were ready to fly, they were delivered to Baikonour.

== Launch ==
Mars 2M No.521 was launched at 10:40:45 UTC on March 27, 1969, atop a Proton-K 8K78K carrier rocket with a Blok D upper stage, flying from Baikonur Cosmodrome Site 81/23. First and second stage burn went normally, followed by payload shroud jettison. However, third stage ignition did not occur on time and reports filtered back to the launch center that the booster had exploded. Investigation found that an imbalanced rotor in the third stage oxidizer turbopump had started a fire, which led to loss of thrust and vehicle breakup. The remains of the third stage and probe impacted in the Altai Mountains. Even more difficult for Soviet engineers was the news that Mariner 7 had been successfully launched from Cape Canaveral a few days earlier, and their next Mars launch also failed a few days later.

== Scientific Instruments ==
The scientific instruments were:

- Radiometer
- Instrument to measure water vapor levels
- Ultraviolet spectrometer
- Gamma spectrometer
- Hydrogen mass spectrometer
- Helium mass spectrometer
- Spectrometer
- Low energy ion spectrometer
- Imaging system (with three on-board cameras)

== See also ==
- List of missions to Mars
