= Kosmos 419 =

Failed Soviet orbiter mission to Mars (1971)

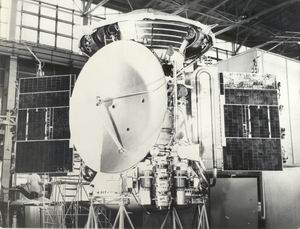
- Mission type: Mars orbiter
- Operator: Soviet space program
- COSPAR ID: 1971-042A
- SATCAT no.: 5221
- Mission duration: 2 days

Spacecraft properties
- Spacecraft type: 3MS No. 170
- Manufacturer: NPO Lavochkin
- Launch mass: 4,650 kg (10,250 lb)

Start of mission
- Launch date: 10 May 1971, 16:58:42 UTC
- Rocket: Proton-K/D
- Launch site: Baikonur 81/23
- Contractor: Khrunichev

End of mission
- Disposal: Launch failure
- Decay date: 12 May 1971

Orbital parameters
- Reference system: Geocentric
- Regime: Low Earth
- Perigee altitude: 134 km
- Apogee altitude: 187 km
- Inclination: 51.5°
- Period: 87.7 min

Kosmos 419 (Russian: Космос 419 meaning Cosmos 419), also known as 3MS No.170 was a failed Soviet spacecraft intended to visit Mars. The spacecraft was launched on 10 May 1971, but due to an upper stage malfunction, it failed to depart low Earth orbit.

== Background ==
In 1971, Mars was at its closest to Earth since 1956, and in May of that year, both the Soviet Union and the United States made new attempts to reach the Red Planet. Kosmos 419 was intended to overtake the United States probes, Mariner 8 and Mariner 9, with the aim of becoming the first Mars orbiter. As it was, Mariner 8 was lost in a launch failure two days before Kosmos 419 was launched, and Mariner 9 went on to become the first spacecraft to orbit Mars.

== Launch ==
Kosmos 419 was one of three Mars spacecraft launched by the Soviet Union in 1971, the others being Mars 2 and Mars 3; launched days after Kosmos 419. Unlike the 4M spacecraft, Mars 2 and 3, Kosmos 419 was a 3MS spacecraft which consisted only of an orbiter, with no lander. It was the ninth Soviet spacecraft launched to Mars.

== Orbit ==
A Proton-K carrier rocket successfully put the spacecraft and a Blok D upper stage into a low earth parking orbit with an apogee of 174 kilometres (108 mi) and a perigee of 159 kilometres (99 mi) and an inclination of 51.4 degrees. The Blok D's ignition timer was incorrectly set, resulting in it failing to ignite; the timer had been set so that the stage would ignite 1.5 years after launch rather than the intended 1.5 hours. Due to its low orbit, which quickly decayed, Kosmos 419 reentered the Earth's atmosphere on 12 May 1971, two days after launch.

The designation Kosmos 419 was a generic name given to Soviet spacecraft operating in Earth orbit; at the time, Soviet planetary spacecraft which failed to depart Earth orbit would be given designations in the Kosmos series to disguise the failure. Had it departed Earth orbit, Kosmos 419 would have become Mars 2, a designation which was used instead for the next mission, 4M No.171.

== Scientific Instruments ==
1. Fluxgate Magnetometer
2. Infrared Radiometer
3. Infrared Photometer
4. Spectrometer
5. Photometer
6. Radiometer
7. Ultraviolet Photometer
8. Cosmic-ray detector
9. Charged particle spectrometer
10. Imaging System
11. Stereo antenna

== See also ==
- 1971 in spaceflight
- List of missions to Mars
- Timeline of artificial satellites and space probes
