= Mars 2M No.522 =

Soviet spacecraft

2M No.522
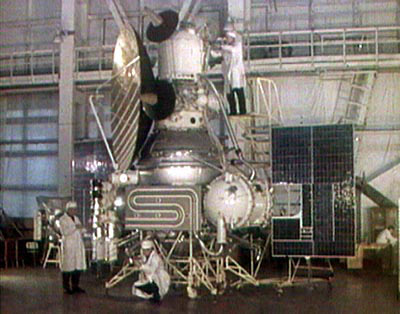
- Mars 1969A
- Mission type: Mars orbiter
- Mission duration: Failed to orbit

Spacecraft properties
- Spacecraft type: 2M
- Manufacturer: NPO Lavochkin
- Launch mass: 4,850 kg (10,690 lb)

Start of mission
- Launch date: 2 April 1969, 10:33:00 UTC
- Rocket: Proton-K/D s/n 233-01
- Launch site: Baikonur 81/24

Mars 2M No.522, also known as Mars M-69 No.522 and sometimes identified by NASA as Mars 1969B, was a Soviet spacecraft which was lost in a launch failure in 1969. It consisted of an orbiter. The spacecraft was intended to image the surface of Mars using three cameras, with images being encoded for transmission back to Earth as television signals. It also carried a radiometer, a series of spectrometers, and an instrument to detect water vapour in the atmosphere of Mars. It was one of two Mars 2M spacecraft, along with Mars 2M No.521, which was launched in 1969 as part of the Mars program. Neither launch was successful.

== Launch ==
Mars 2M No.522 was launched at 10:33:00 UTC on 2 April 1969 atop a Proton-K 8K78K carrier rocket with a Block D upper stage, flying from Baikonur Cosmodrome Site 81/24. One of the first stage engines caught fire almost immediately at liftoff. The remaining engines managed to compensate for about 30 seconds of flight, but the thrust section fire eventually resulted in loss of control. The engines shut down, and the rocket fell back to Earth and exploded 41 seconds after ignition.

== Scientific instruments ==
Scientific instruments on the spacecraft were:

- Radiometer
- Ultraviolet spectrometer
- Instrument to measure water vapor levels
- Radiation detector
- Gamma spectrometer
- Hydrogen mass spectrometer
- Helium mass spectrometer
- Spectrometer
- Low-energy ion spectrometer
- Imaging system (three on board cameras)

== Post-accident effect ==
Following the crash of the Mars 2M No.522 launch vehicle, the wind spread toxic propellant back across the launch complex, which made the Baikonur Cosmodrome launch complex unusable until rain washed the toxic residuals away. Launch personnel were trapped and unable to leave the cosmodrome as a pool of spilled nitrogen tetroxide was blocking one of the entryways out, while other entryway was blocked by the still-intact second stage of the rocket. By the time this had happened, the alignment of Earth and Mars necessary to launch spacecraft had ended, and the Soviets were unable to launch any further Mars probes until 1971. It also resulted in delays to a number of Luna spacecraft scheduled for launch in 1969. The accident left a deep impression on Soviet military personnel attending the launch and helped spur the development of next-generation ballistic missiles with safer solid propellants.

== See also ==
- List of missions to Mars
