= M-69 (spacecraft) =

Soviet unmanned Mars probe design

Mars-69 (2M)
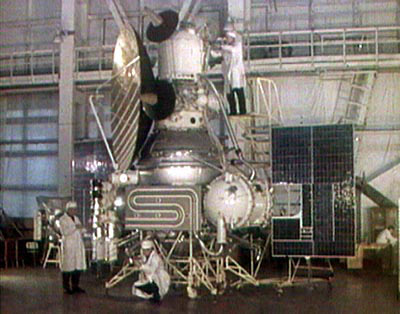
- Manufacturer: NPO Lavochkin
- Country of origin: Soviet Union

Specifications
- Launch mass: 4,850 kg (10,690 lb)

The Mars-69/M-69 or 2M was the designation given to 2 Soviet Mars probes that were to be sent in 1969. Based on the Luna E-8 landers used for Luna 15-24 (including Lunokhod 1 and 2), they were the first attempted Mars and Interplanetary Orbiters. The probes, however, were both destroyed in separate launches in early 1969.

== Development and launches ==
After the landing of Venera 4 in October 1967, NPO Lavochkin looked at landing a larger probe on Mars with an Orbiter. Using the newer Proton-K (Blok-D), they could beat NASA's upcoming Mariner 6 and 7 probes in the 1969 Mars launch window. By modifying the E-8 lander, the original M-69 design was created with a lander. The M-69 bus was however changed with a hard lander before finally in 1969, the lander was abandoned due to time constraints.

The first launch occurred on March 27, 1969, when Mars-69A (2M No.521) was launched. Although the first two stages of the Proton-K worked, the third stage failed, and the probe crashed in the Altai Mountains.

The second and last launch (2M No.522) on April 2, 1969, failed when the Proton-K Blok-D carrying it first had smoke appearing from the first stage before it veered west, crashing near Site 81/23.

== Legacy ==
After the failure of M-69, NPO Lavochkin redesigned Mars-69 to allow for a landing on Mars in 1971. This design would become the M-71, the first version of 4MV bus.
