= Alberto Castro-Tirado =

Spanish astronomer

Alberto Javier Castro-Tirado
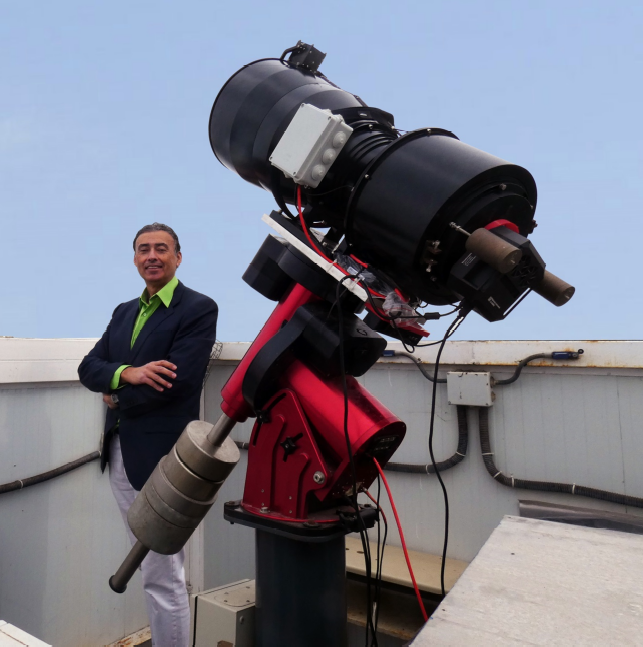
- Alberto J. Castro-Tirado, 2023, BOOTES-1 Robotic Astronomy Telescope Observatory, Huelva
- Born: 196ž MálagaSpain
- Education: University of Granada University of Copenhagen
- Known for: Gamma-ray burst
- Awards: Descartes Prize in 2022
- Scientific career
- Fields: AstrophysicsAstronomy
- Workplaces: Instituto de Astrofísica de Andalucía

Alberto Javier Castro-Tirado (born 1966) is a Spanish astronomer, know for his research in Gamma-ray burst and development of the Robotic telescopes. He studied at the Colegio Azorín de Madrid (1971–1973) and Colegio Los Olivos de Málaga (1973–1984). In 1989, he finished his master's studies in physics at the University of Granada, and in 1994, he finished his doctoral studies at the University of Copenhagen.

During his studies in Copenhagen, he participated in the "WATCH" x-ray experiment of the Granat space telescope. After finishing his studies, he joined the "Laboratorio de Astrofísica Espacial y Física Fundamental" at the European Space Astronomy Center near Madrid.
