= Areocentric orbit =

Orbit around the planet Mars

Animation of 2001 Mars Odyssey's trajectory around Mars from October 24, 2001, to October 24, 2002 2001 Mars Odyssey · Mars

An areocentric orbit is an orbit around the planet Mars.

The areo- prefix is derived from Ares, the Greek equivalent of the Roman god Mars. The name is analogous to the term geocentric orbit for an orbit around Earth and heliocentric orbit for an orbit around the Sun. As with these other orbits, the apsides of an areocentric orbit are sometimes called by specialized names: the pericenter is named periareon (analogous to perigee) and the apocenter is named apoareon (analogous to apogee).

The first artificial satellite to orbit another planet — the U.S. probe Mariner 9 — entered areocentric orbit on 13 November 1971. Within a month, Mariner 9 was joined in orbit by two Soviet orbiters: Mars 2 (27 November 1971) and Mars 3 (2 December 1971).

== See also ==
- Areostationary orbit
- Heliocentrism
- List of orbits
- Cytherocentric orbit
