= Soviet Mars program =

Space program of the Soviet Union

The Mars program was a series of uncrewed spacecraft launched by the Soviet Union between 1960 and 1973. The spacecraft were intended to explore Mars, and included flyby probes, landers and orbiters.

Early Mars spacecraft were small, and launched by Molniya rockets. Starting with two failures in 1969, the heavier Proton-K rocket was used to launch larger 5 tonne spacecraft, consisting of an orbiter and a lander to Mars. The orbiter bus design was likely somewhat rushed into service and immature, considering that it performed very unreliably in the Venera variant after 1975. This reliability problem was common to much Soviet space hardware from the late 1960s and early 1970s and was largely corrected with a deliberate policy, implemented in the mid-1970s, of consolidating (or "debugging") existing designs rather than introducing new ones. The names of the "Mars" missions do not need to be translated, as the word "Mars" is spelled and pronounced approximately the same way in English and Russian.

In addition to the Mars program, the Soviet Union also sent a probe to Mars as part of the Zond program; Zond 2, however it failed en route. Two more spacecraft were sent during the Phobos program; both failed. In 1996, Russia launched Mars 96, its first interplanetary mission since the dissolution of the Soviet Union, however it failed to depart Earth orbit.

== Spacecraft ==
=== Mars 1M ===
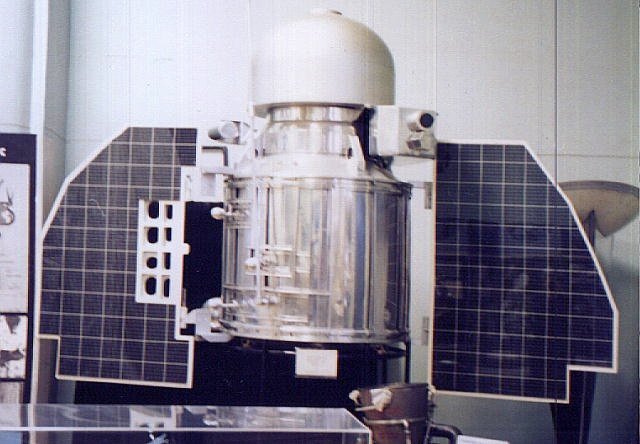
A Mars 1M spacecraft

The first Soviet attempts to send a probe to Mars were the two Mars 1M spacecraft, which each had a mass of about 650 kg. Both were launched in 1960 and failed to achieve orbit. The spacecraft were dubbed Marsnik by the Western media.

Public name	Internal name	Mission	Launch date	Carrier rocket	Outcome	Remarks
Mars 1960A	1M No.1	Flyby	10 October 1960	Molniya	Failure	Also known as Marsnik 1 in the West, it was destroyed in a launch failure caused by upper stage malfunction
Mars 1960B	1M No.2	Flyby	14 October 1960	Molniya	Failure	Also known as Marsnik 2 in the West, it was destroyed in a launch failure caused by oxidizer leak in the upper stage

=== Mars 2MV ===
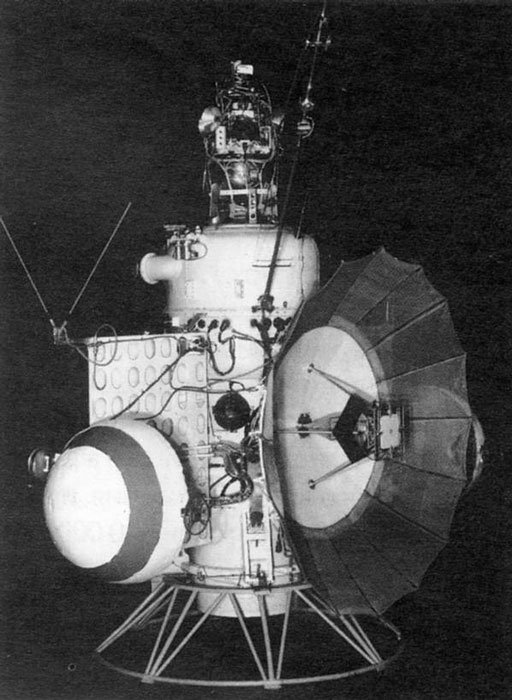
Mars 1

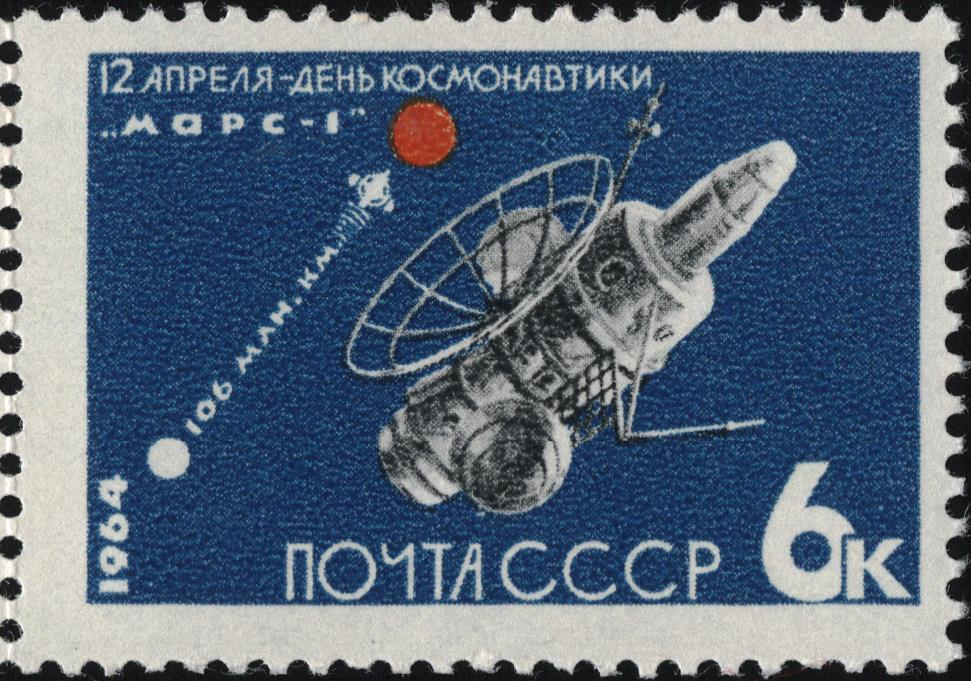
Mars 1 stamp

Mars 1 was launched in 1962 but failed en route to Mars. Two other Soviet launches at around the same time, Mars 2MV-4 No.1 and Mars 2MV-3 No.1 were 900-kilogram (2,000 lb) spacecraft, however both failed to leave Earth orbit due to problems with the upper stages of their carrier rockets.

Public name	Internal name	Mission	Launch date	Carrier rocket	Outcome	Remarks
Sputnik 22	2MV-4 No.1	Flyby	24 October 1962	Molniya	Failure	Exploded during trans-Mars injection burn. Debris fell back to Earth until 26 February 1963
Mars 1	2MV-4 No.2	Flyby	1 November 1962	Molniya	Failure	Contact lost en route to Mars on 21 March 1963, though it did manage to fly past the planet at a distance of 100,000 km on 19 June 1963 without sending any scientific data
Sputnik 24	2MV-3 No.1	Flyby	4 November 1962	Molniya	Failure	Trans-Mars injection burn failed due to damage sustained at T+260 seconds after launch. Debris fell back to Earth until 19 January 1963

=== Mars 2M ===
Mars 2M No.521 and Mars 2M No.522, known in the West as Mars 1969A and B, were heavier spacecraft with masses of 5 tonnes (4.9 long tons; 5.5 short tons). They were launched by Proton-K rockets, and consisted of orbiters. Both were destroyed during launch.

=== Mars 4M ===
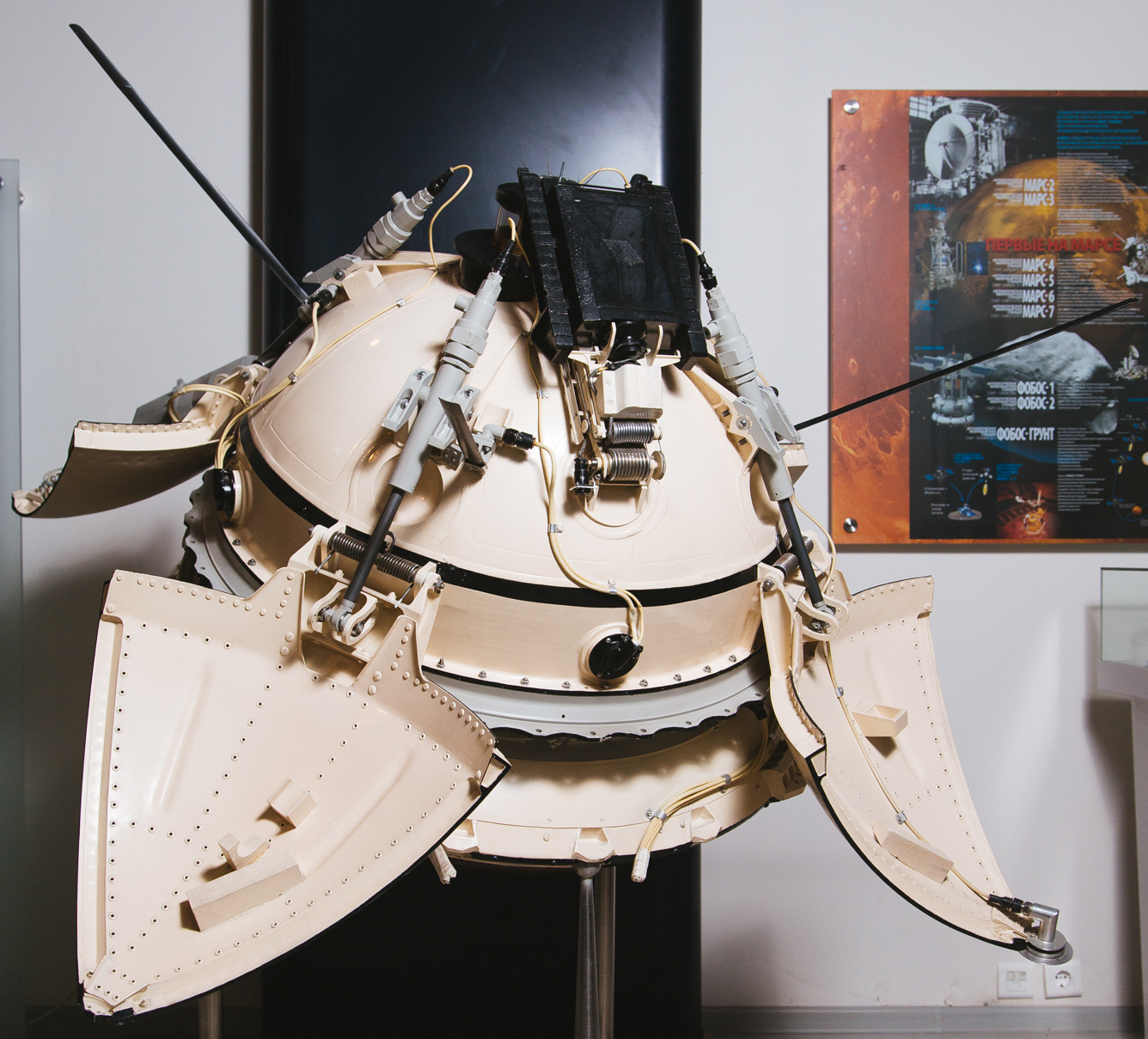
Mars 2 and Mars 3 lander

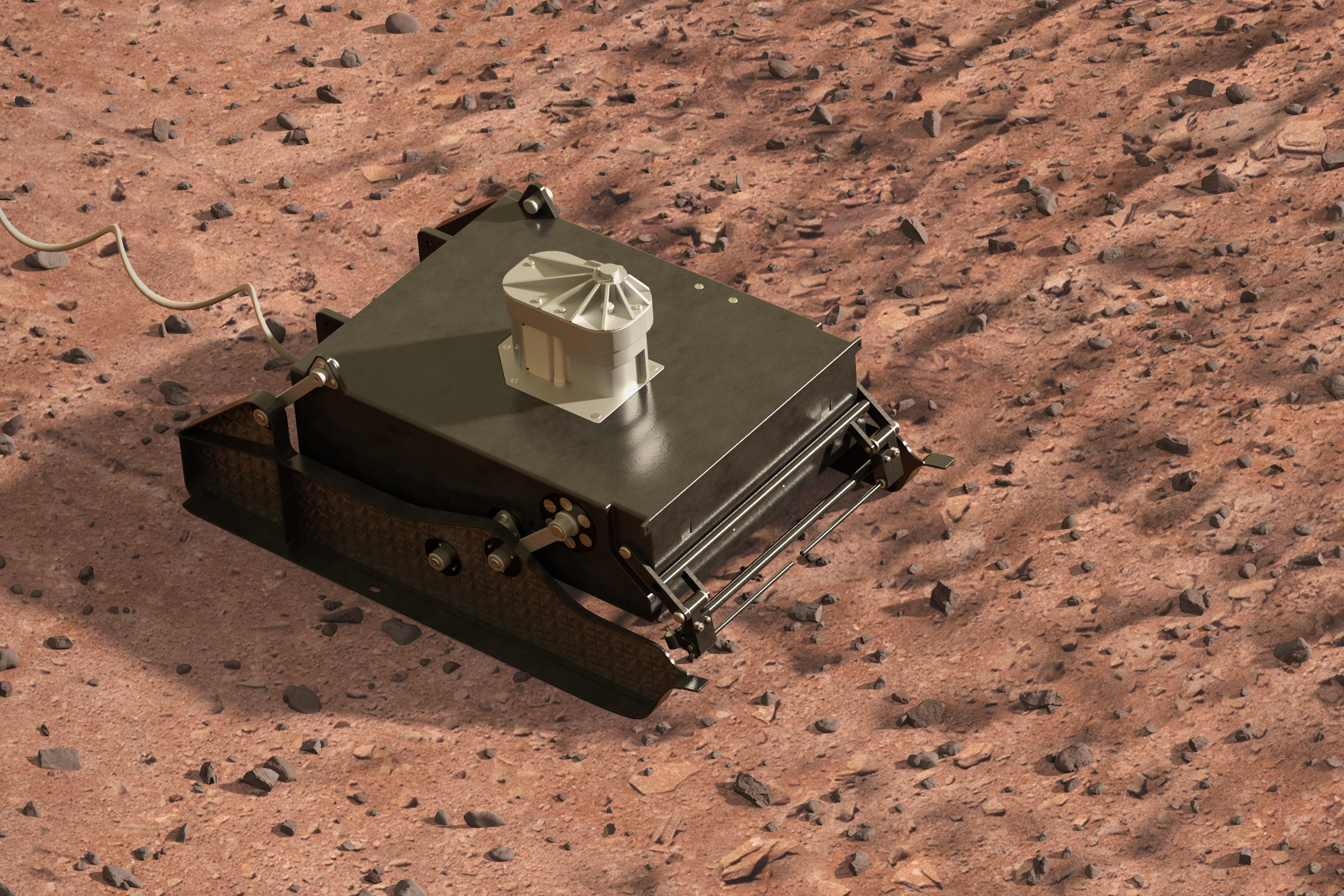
PrOP-M rover

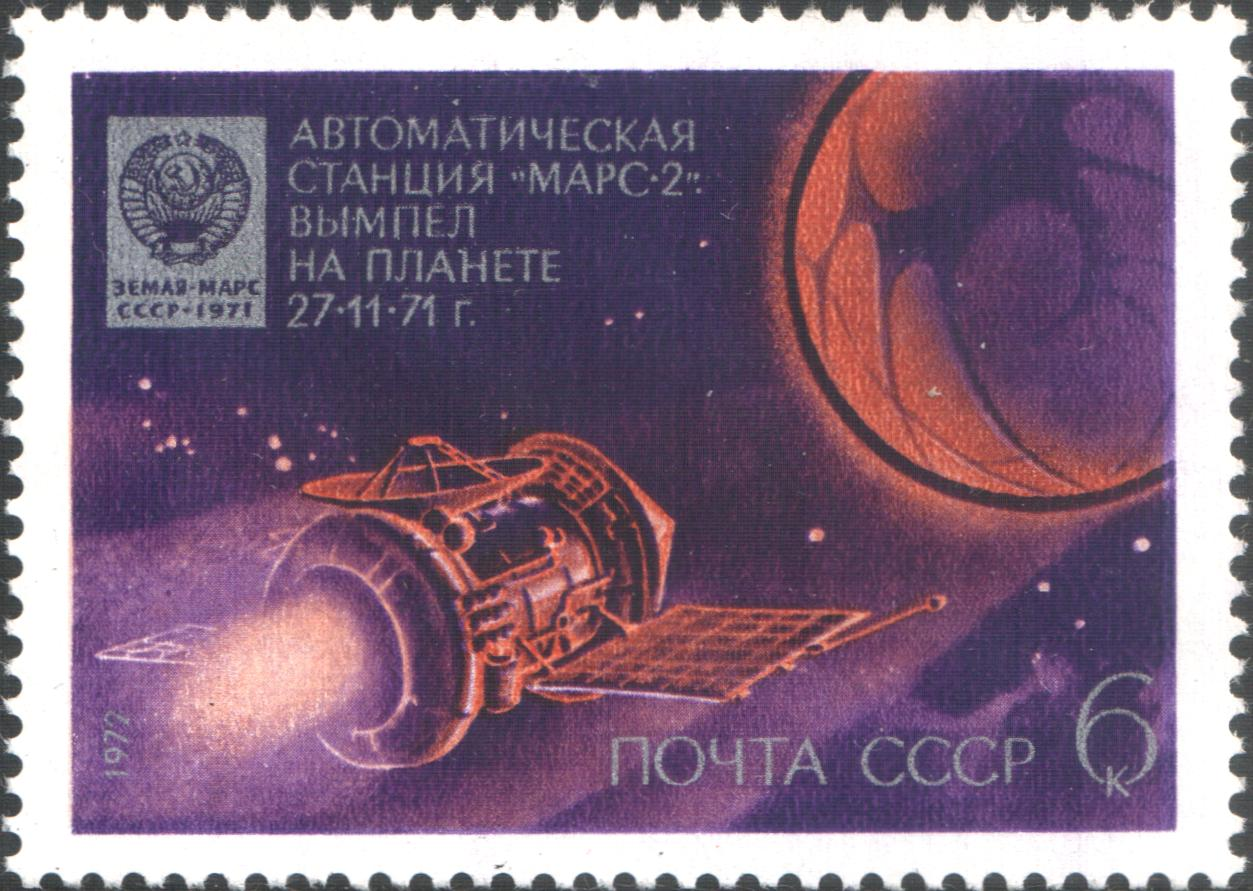
Mars 2 stamp

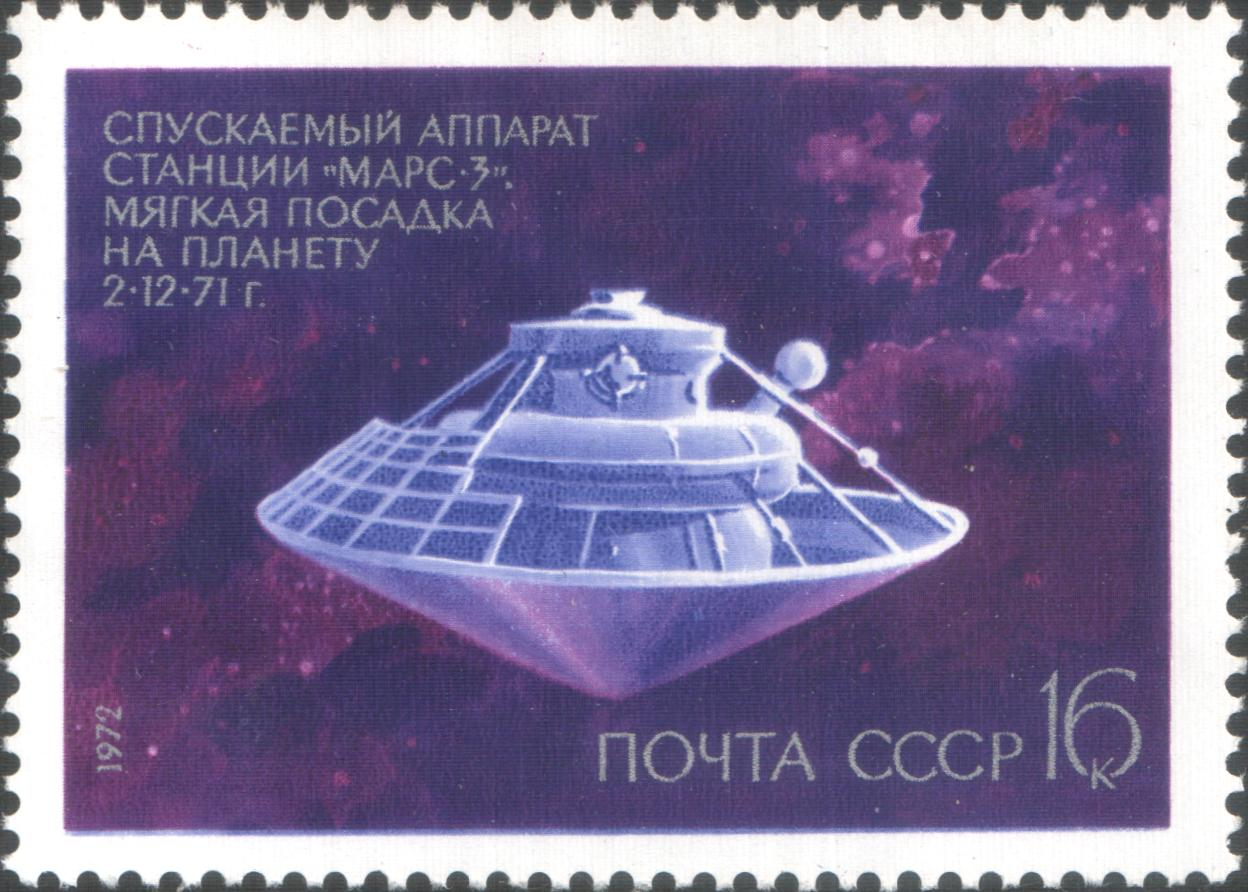
Mars 3 lander stamp

The Mars 4M spacecraft; Mars 2 and Mars 3 missions consisted of identical spacecraft, each with an orbiter and an attached lander, which became the first spacecraft to reach the surface of Mars.

The orbiters' primary scientific objectives were to image the Martian surface and clouds, determine the temperature on Mars, study the topography, composition and physical properties of the surface, measure properties of the atmosphere, monitor the solar wind and the interplanetary and Martian magnetic fields, and act as communications relays to send signals from the landers to Earth.

Both landers had a small Mars rover, PrOP-M, on board, which would move across the surface on skis while connected to the lander with a 15-meter umbilical. Two small metal rods were used for autonomous obstacle avoidance, as radio signals from Earth would take too long to drive the rovers using remote control. Each rover had both a densitometer and a dynamic penetrometer, to test the density and the bearing strength of the soil. Because of the demise of the landers, neither rover saw action.

The Mars 2 and 3 orbiters sent back a large volume of data covering the period from December 1971 to March 1972, although transmissions continued through August. It was announced that Mars 2 and 3 had completed their missions by August 22, 1972, after 362 orbits completed by Mars 2 and 20 orbits by Mars 3. The probes sent back a total of 60 pictures. The images and data enabled creation of surface relief maps, and gave information on the Martian gravity and magnetic fields.

Public name	Internal name	Mission	Launch date	Carrier rocket	Outcome	Remarks
Mars 2	4M No.171	Orbiter/ Lander	19 May 1971	Proton-K/D	Partial failure	Successfully inserted into a 1,380 x 24,940 km elliptical orbit on 27 November 1971. However, its lander crashed somewhere within Hellas Planitia (45°S 30°W)
Mars 3	4M No.172	Orbiter/ Lander	28 May 1971	Proton-K/D	Success	Successfully inserted into a 1,500 x 211,400 km elliptical orbit on 2 December 1971. Its lander became the first spacecraft to land intact on Mars, however contact lost just 110 seconds after touchdown on Ptolemaeus Crater (45°S 202°E)

=== Mars 3MS ===
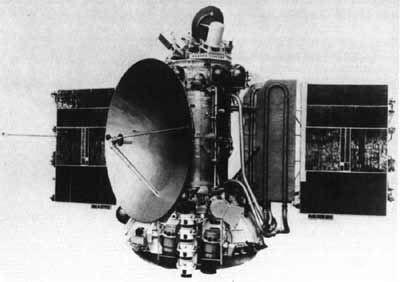
Mars 4 and Mars 5

The Mars 3MS were orbiter-only spacecraft launched three times between 1971 and 1973. The first of which, Kosmos 419, was intended to become the first spacecraft to orbit Mars, beating NASA's Mariner 8 and Mariner 9, however it failed to leave low Earth orbit. Two additional 3MS missions, Mars 4 and Mars 5, were launched in 1973 to act as communications relay for Mars 6 and 7.

Public name	Internal name	Mission	Launch date	Carrier rocket	Outcome	Remarks
Kosmos 419	3MS No.170	Orbiter	10 May 1971	Proton-K/D	Failure	Stranded in LEO after its Blok D stage malfunctioned. Reentered two days later on 12 May 1971
Mars 4	3MS No.52S	Orbiter	21 July 1973	Proton-K/D	Failure	Did not insert itself into orbit around Mars due to propulsion failure on 10 February 1974. Closest distance to the planet was 1,836 km and returned only 12 images back to Earth
Mars 5	3MS No.53S	Orbiter	25 July 1973	Proton-K/D	Success	Successfully inserted into a 1,755 x 32,555 km elliptical orbit on 12 February 1974, returning 60 images of the planet's surface. Collected data until it suffered a systems failure that ended the mission on 28 February 1974

=== Mars 3MP ===
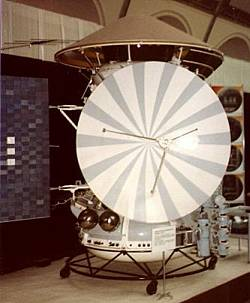
Mars 6 and Mars 7

In 1973 the speed required to place a spacecraft in an interplanetary trajectory had to be increased. Thus the Proton could not deliver spacecraft with an orbiter and an attached lander to the necessary trajectory to reach Mars, as had been possible in 1971. To resolve this problem, four spacecraft were launched. The Mars 4 and 5 orbiters, which had been launched separately, were used to relay communications, and to complete mission objectives which would have been completed by landers. Two landers were launched with orbiter type buses (Mars 6 and 7), but without fuel to enter orbit of the Mars satellite.

Public name	Internal name	Mission	Launch date	Carrier rocket	Outcome	Remarks
Mars 6	3MP No.50P	Flyby/ Lander	5 August 1973	Proton-K/D	Partial failure	Lander transmitted 224 seconds of (corrupted) atmospheric data before crash-landing on 12 March 1974. Landing coordinates were 23.90°S 19.42°W within Margaritifer Terra
Mars 7	3MP No.51P	Flyby/ Lander	9 August 1973	Proton-K/D	Failure	Missed Mars by 1,300 km on 9 March 1974 due to premature spacecraft separation. Intended landing coordinates were 50°S 28°W. Last contact with flyby bus on 25 March 1974

=== Mars 4NM and 5NM ===
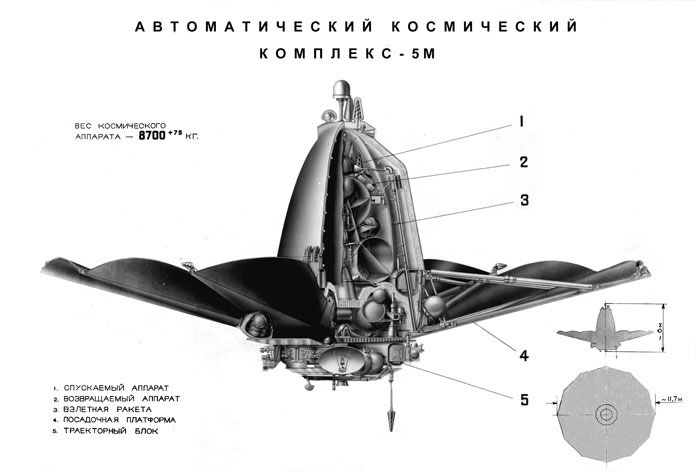
Mars 5NM

The Mars 4NM and Mars 5NM projects would have seen heavier spacecraft launched by N1 rockets. They would have deployed heavy Marsokhod rovers onto the surface, and conducted sample return missions. The N1 failed on all four of its test flights, and was never used to launch any Mars spacecraft.

=== Mars 5M ===
Mars 5M (Mars 79) was a sample return mission developed in 1977 to be double launched in 1979 by Proton launchers and then docked in Earth orbit for a joint flight of orbital and return modules to Mars. The project was canceled due to the low reliability of the Igla automatic docking system.

== See also ==
- Exploration of Mars
- Space exploration
- Robotic spacecraft
- Soviet Space Program
