= Granat =

Soviet/Russian space telescope (1989–1998)

International Astrophysical Observatory
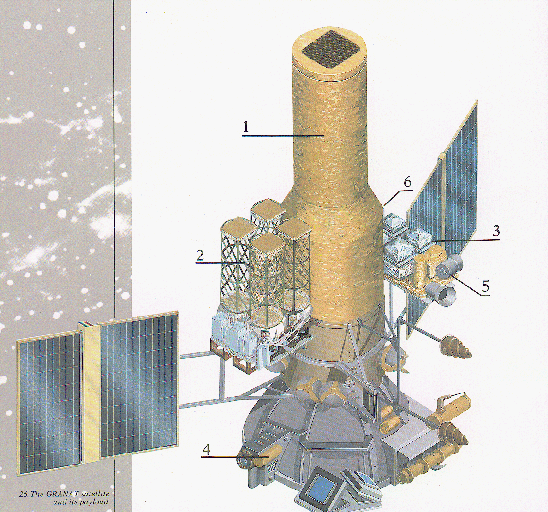
- picture credit: NASA
- Names: Granat; Astron 2
- Mission type: Astronomy
- Operator: Soviet space program Roscosmos
- COSPAR ID: 1989-096A
- SATCAT no.: 20352
- Website: hea.iki.rssi.ru
- Mission duration: 8 years, 11 months and 26 days

Spacecraft properties
- Bus: 4MV
- Manufacturer: NPO Lavochkin
- Launch mass: ~4,400 kg (9,700 lb)
- Payload mass: ~2,300 kg (5,100 lb)
- Dimensions: 4.0 × 2.5 m (13.1 × 8.2 ft)
- Power: 400 W

Start of mission
- Launch date: 20:20, December 1, 1989 (UTC)
- Rocket: Proton-K/D-1
- Launch site: Baikonur 200/40

End of mission
- Disposal: Deorbited
- Last contact: 27 November 1998
- Decay date: May 25, 1999

Orbital parameters
- Reference system: Geocentric
- Regime: Highly elliptical
- Eccentricity: 0.92193
- Perigee altitude: 1,760 kilometres (1,090 mi)
- Apogee altitude: 202,480 kilometres (125,820 mi)
- Inclination: 51.9 degrees
- Period: 5,880 minutes
- Epoch: 01 December 1989

Main telescope
- Name: SIGMA
- Type: Coded mask
- Diameter: 1.2 metres (3.9 ft)
- Focal length: 2.5 metres (8.2 ft)
- Collecting area: 800 cm^{2} (120 sq in)
- Wavelengths: X-ray to γ-ray, 1–620 pm (2 keV – 1.3 MeV)

Instruments
SIGMA	X-ray/gamma-ray telescope
ART-P	X-ray telescope
ART-S	X-ray spectrometer
PHEBUS	Gamma-burst detector
WATCH	All-sky monitor
KONUS	GRB experiment
TOURNESOL	GRB experiment

The International Astrophysical Observatory "GRANAT" (usually known as Granat; Russian: Гранат, lit. pomegranate), was a Soviet (later Russian) space observatory developed in collaboration with France, Denmark and Bulgaria. It was launched on 1 December 1989 aboard a Proton rocket and placed in a highly eccentric four-day orbit, of which three were devoted to observations. It operated for almost nine years.

In September 1994, after nearly five years of directed observations, the gas supply for its attitude control was exhausted and the observatory was placed in a non-directed survey mode. Transmissions finally ceased on 27 November 1998.

With seven different instruments on board, Granat was designed to observe the universe at energies ranging from X-ray to gamma ray. Its main instrument, SIGMA, was capable of imaging both hard X-ray and soft gamma-ray sources. The PHEBUS instrument was meant to study gamma-ray bursts and other transient X-Ray sources. Other experiments such as ART-P were intended to image X-Ray sources in the 35 to 100 keV range. One instrument, WATCH, was designed to monitor the sky continuously and alert the other instruments to new or interesting X-Ray sources. The ART-S spectrometer covered the X-ray energy range while the KONUS-B and TOURNESOL experiments covered both the X-ray and gamma ray spectrum.

== Spacecraft ==
Granat was a three-axis-stabilized spacecraft and the last of the 4MV Bus produced by the Lavochkin Scientific Production Association. It was similar to the Astron observatory which was functional from 1983 to 1989; for this reason, the spacecraft was originally known as the Astron 2. It weighed 4.4 metric tons and carried almost 2.3 metric tons of international scientific instrumentation. Granat stood 6.5 m tall and had a total span of 8.5 m across its solar arrays. The power made available to the scientific instruments was approximately 400 W.

== Launch and orbit ==
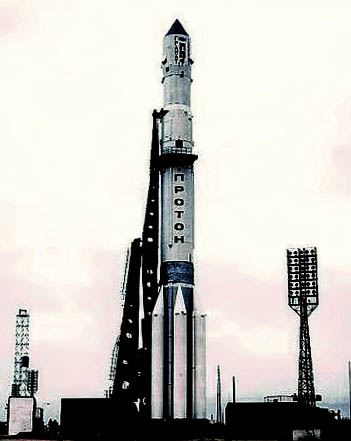
Proton launch vehicle carrying Granat

The spacecraft was launched on 1 December 1989 aboard a Proton-K from the Baikonur Cosmodrome in Kazakh SSR. It was placed in a highly eccentric 98-hour orbit with an initial apogee/perigee of 202,480 km/1,760 km respectively and an inclination of 51.9 degrees. This meant that solar and lunar perturbations would significantly increase the orbits inclination while reducing its eccentricity, such that the orbit had become near-circular by the time Granat completed its directed observations in September 1994. (By 1991, the perigee had increased to 20,000 km; by September 1994, the apogee/perigee was 59,025 km / 144,550 km at an inclination of 86.7 degrees.)

Three days out of the four-day orbit were devoted to observations. After over nine years in orbit, the observatory finally reentered the Earth's atmosphere on May 25, 1999.

Granat observatory orbit change (1994 predictions)
Date	Perigee (km)	Apogee (km)	Arg.perigee (deg)	Inc. (deg)	Long.asc.node (deg)
December 1, 1989	1,760	202,480	285	51.9	20.0
December 1, 1991	23,893	179,376	311.9	82.6	320.3
December 1, 1994	58,959	144,214	343.0	86.5	306.9
December 1, 1996	42,088.8	160,888	9.6	93.4	302.2

== Instrumentation ==
=== SIGMA ===
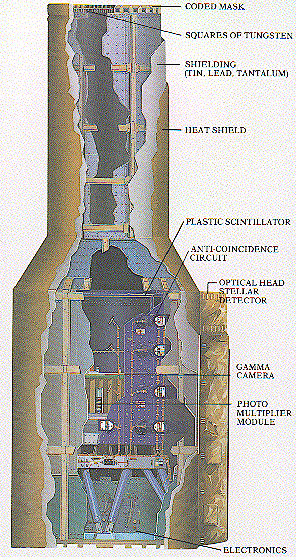
SIGMA instrument

The hard X-ray and low-energy gamma-ray SIGMA telescope was a collaboration between CESR (Toulouse) and CEA (Saclay). It covered the energy range 35–1300 keV, with an effective area of 800 cm^{2} and a maximum sensitivity field of view of ~5°×5°. The maximum angular resolution was 15 arcmin. The energy resolution was 8% at 511 keV. Its imaging capabilities were derived from the association of a coded mask and a position sensitive detector based on the Anger camera principle.

=== ART-P ===
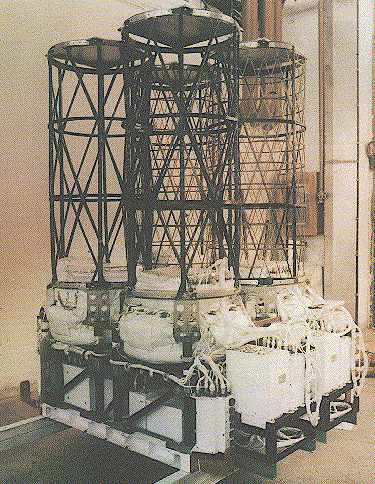
ART-P instrument

The ART-P X-ray telescope was the responsibility of the IKI in Moscow. The instrument covered the energy range 4 to 60 keV for imaging and 4 to 100 keV for spectroscopy and timing. There were four identical modules of the ART-P telescope, each consisting of a position sensitive multi-wire proportional counter (MWPC) together with a URA coded mask. Each module had an effective area of approximately 600 cm^{2}, producing a field of view of 1.8° by 1.8°. The angular resolution was 5 arcmin; temporal and energy resolutions were 3.9 ms and 22% at 6 keV, respectively. The instrument achieved a sensitivity of 0.001 of the Crab Nebula source (= 1 "mCrab") in an eight-hour exposure. The maximum time resolution was 4 ms.

=== ART-S ===
The ART-S X-ray spectrometer, also built by the IKI, covered the energy range 3 to 100 keV. Its field of view was 2° by 2°. The instrument consisted of four detectors based on spectroscopic MWPCs, making an effective area of 2,400 cm^{2} at 10 keV and 800 cm^{2} at 100 keV. The time resolution was 200 microseconds.

=== PHEBUS ===
The PHEBUS experiment was designed by CESR (Toulouse) to record high energy transient events in the range 100 keV to 100 MeV. It consisted of two independent detectors and their associated electronics. Each detector consisted of a bismuth germanate (BGO) crystal 78 mm in diameter by 120 mm thick, surrounded by a plastic anti-coincidence jacket. The two detectors were arranged on the spacecraft so as to observe 4π steradians. The burst mode was triggered when the count rate in the 0.1 to 1.5 MeV energy range exceeded the background level by 8 sigma in either 0.25 or 1.0 seconds. There were 116 energy channels.

=== WATCH ===
Starting in January 1990, four WATCH instruments, designed by the Danish Space Research Institute, were in operation on the Granat observatory. The instruments could localize bright sources in the 6 to 180 keV range to within 0.5° using a Rotation Modulation Collimator. Taken together, the instruments' three fields of view covered approximately 75% of the sky. The energy resolution was 30% FWHM at 60 keV. During quiet periods, count rates in two energy bands (6 to 15 and 15 to 180 keV) were accumulated for 4, 8, or 16 seconds, depending on onboard computer memory availability. During a burst or transient event, count rates were accumulated with a time resolution of 1 second per 36 energy channels.

=== KONUS-B ===
The KONUS-B instrument, designed by the Ioffe Physico-Technical Institute in St. Petersburg, consisted of seven detectors distributed around the spacecraft that responded to photons of 10 keV to 8 MeV energy. They consisted of NaI(Tl) scintillator crystals 200 mm in diameter by 50 mm thick behind a Be entrance window. The side surfaces were protected by a 5 mm thick lead layer. The burst detection threshold was 500 to 50 microjoules per square meter (5 × 10^{-7} to 5 × 10^{-8} erg/cm^{2}), depending on the burst spectrum and rise time. Spectra were taken in two 31-channel pulse height analyzers (PHAs), of which the first eight were measured with 1/16 s time resolution and the remaining with variable time resolutions depending on the count rate. The range of resolutions covered 0.25 to 8 s.

The KONUS-B instrument operated from 11 December 1989 until 20 February 1990. Over that period, the "on" time for the experiment was 27 days. Some 60 solar flares and 19 cosmic gamma-ray bursts were detected.

=== TOURNESOL ===
The French TOURNESOL instrument consisted of four proportional counters and two optical detectors. The proportional counters detected photons between 2 keV and 20 MeV in a 6° by 6° field of view. The visible detectors had a field of view of 5° by 5°. The instrument was designed to look for optical counterparts of high-energy burst sources, as well as performing spectral analysis of the high-energy events.

== Science results ==
Over the initial four years of directed observations, Granat observed many galactic and extra-galactic X-ray sources with emphasis on the deep imaging and spectroscopy of the Galactic Center, broad-band observations of black hole candidates, and X-ray novae. After 1994, the observatory was switched to survey mode and carried out a sensitive all-sky survey in the 40 to 200 keV energy band.

Some of the highlights included:

- A very deep imaging (more than 5 million seconds duration) of the Galactic Center region.
- Discovery of electron-positron annihilation lines from the galactic microquasar 1E1740-294 and the X-ray Nova Muscae.
- Study of spectra and time variability of black hole candidates.
- Across eight years of observations, Granat discovered some twenty new X-ray sources, i.e. candidate black holes and neutron stars. Consequently, their designations begin with "GRS" meaning "GRANAT source". Examples are GRS 1915+105 (the first microquasar discovered in our galaxy) and GRS 1124-683.

== Impact of the dissolution of the Soviet Union ==
After the end of the Soviet Union, two problems arose for the project. The first was geopolitical in nature: the main spacecraft control center was located at the Yevpatoria facility in the Crimea region. This control center was significant in the Soviet space program, being one of only two in the country equipped with a 70 m RT-70 dish antenna. With the breakup of the Union, the Crimea region found itself part of the newly independent Ukraine and the center was put under Ukrainian national control, prompting new political hurdles.

The main and most urgent problem, however, was in finding funds to support the continued operation of the spacecraft amid the spending crunch in post-Soviet Russia. The French space agency, having already contributed significantly to the project (both scientifically and financially), took upon itself to fund the continuing operations directly.

== See also ==
- Astron, a previous space observatory based on the Venera spacecraft.
- Spektr-RG
