= Mars 3 =

Soviet orbiter/lander mission to Mars (1971–1972)

- Mission type: Mars orbiter/lander
- Operator: Soviet space program
- COSPAR ID: 1971-049A; 1971-049F
- SATCAT no.: 5252; 5667
- Mission duration: Orbiter: 1 year, 2 months and 25 days Lander: 1 minute and 50 seconds

Spacecraft properties
- Spacecraft type: 4M No.172
- Manufacturer: OKB-1
- Launch mass: Total: 4,650 kg (10,250 lb); Orbiter: 3,440 kg (7,580 lb); Lander: 1,210 kg (2,670 lb)
- Landing mass: 358 kg (789 lb)
- Dry mass: 2,265 kg (4,993 lb)
- Dimensions: 4.1 × 2.0 × 5.9 m (13.5 × 6.6 × 19.4 ft)

Start of mission
- Launch date: 28 May 1971, 15:26:30 UTC
- Rocket: Proton-K/D
- Launch site: Baikonur 81/23
- Contractor: Khrunichev

End of mission
- Disposal: Decommissioned
- Declared: August 22, 1972
- Last contact: Orbiter: July 1972; Lander: 2 December 1971, 13:53:50 UTC

Orbital parameters
- Reference system: Areocentric
- Periareion altitude: 1,528 km (949 mi)
- Apoareion altitude: 214,500 km (133,300 mi)
- Inclination: 60°
- Period: 12.67 days

Mars orbiter
- Orbital insertion: December 2, 1971

Mars lander
- Landing date: December 2, 1971 13:52 UTC
- Landing site: 45.0445°S 202.0193°E
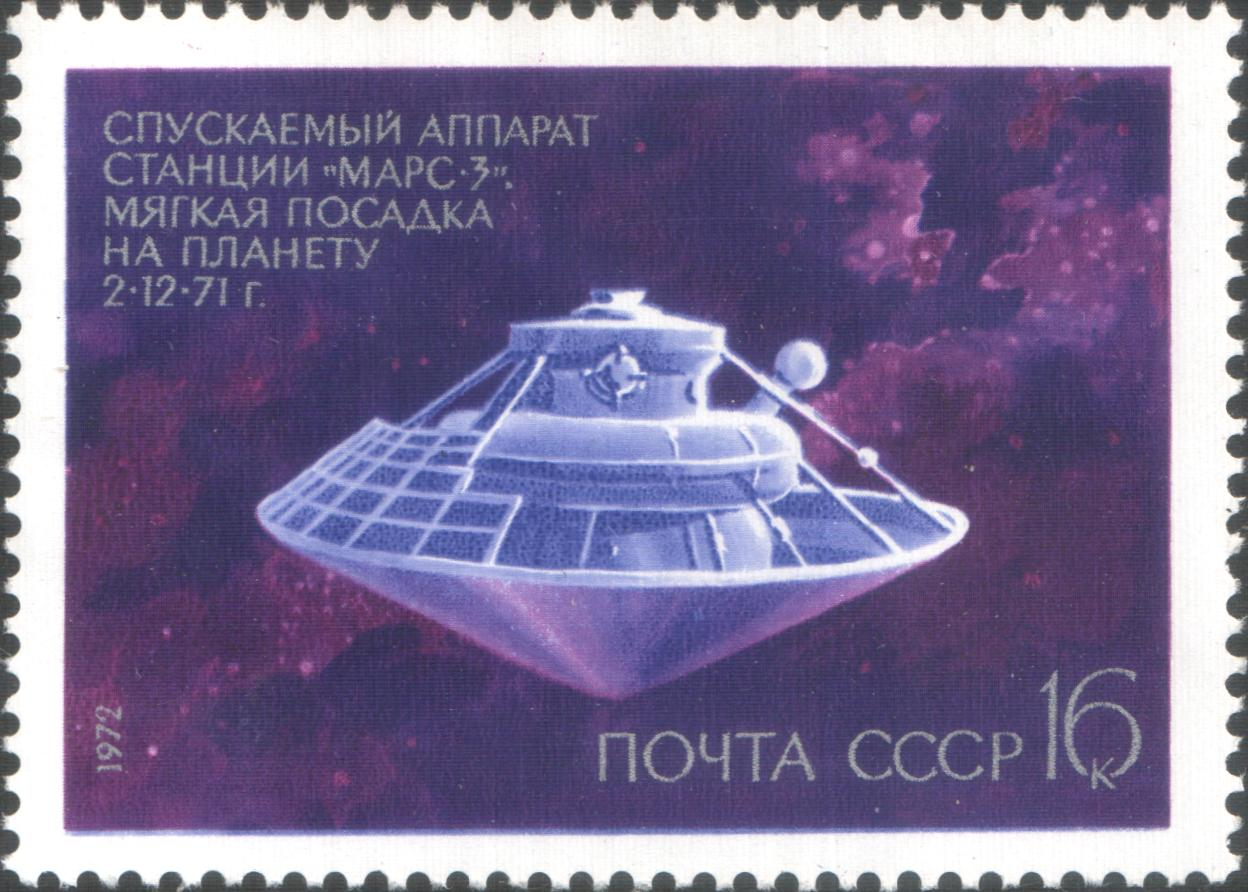
- Mars 3 (lander) stamp Mars program

Mars 3 was a robotic space probe of the Soviet Mars program, launched May 28, 1971, nine days after its twin spacecraft Mars 2. The probes were identical robotic spacecraft launched by Proton-K rockets with a Blok D upper stage, each consisting of an orbiter and an attached lander.

After the Mars 2 lander crashed on the Martian surface, the Mars 3 lander became the first spacecraft to attain a soft landing on Mars, on December 2, 1971. However, it failed 110 seconds after landing, having transmitted only a gray image with no details. The Mars 2 orbiter and Mars 3 orbiter continued to circle Mars and transmit images back to Earth for another eight months.

== Overview ==
- Launch date and time:
  - Mars 3: May 28, 1971 at 15:26:30 UTC
- Launch mass (including fuel):
  - Combined: 4,650 kg (10,250 lb)
  - Orbiter: 3,440 kg (7,580 lb)
  - Lander: 1,210 kg (2,670 lb)
- On-orbit dry mass: 2,265 kg (4,993 lb)
- Dimensions: 4.1 m (13.5 ft) tall, 2 m (6.6 ft) across (5.9 m (19.4 ft) across with solar panels deployed)

== Orbiter ==
The primary purpose of the 4M-V orbiter was to study the topography of the Martian surface; analyze its soil composition; measure various properties of the atmosphere; monitor "solar radiation, the solar wind and the interplanetary and martian magnetic fields". In addition, it served as a "communications relay to send signals from the lander to Earth".

The orbiter suffered from a partial loss of fuel and did not have enough to put itself into a planned 25-hour orbit. The engine instead performed a truncated burn to put the spacecraft into a highly-elliptical long-period (12 day, 19 hours) orbit about Mars.

By coincidence, a particularly large dust storm on Mars adversely affected the mission. When Mariner 9 arrived and successfully orbited Mars on November 14, 1971, just two weeks prior to Mars 2 and Mars 3, planetary scientists were surprised to find the atmosphere was thick with "a planet-wide robe of dust, the largest storm ever observed". The surface was totally obscured. Unable to reprogram the mission computers, both Mars 2 and Mars 3 dispatched their landers immediately, and the orbiters used up a significant portion of their available data resources in snapping images of the featureless dust clouds.

The Mars 3 orbiter sent back data covering the period from December 1971 to March 1972, although transmissions continued through August. It was announced that Mars 3 had completed their mission by August 22, 1972, after 20 orbits. The probe, combined with Mars 2, sent back a total of 60 pictures. The images and data revealed mountains as high as 22 km, atomic hydrogen and oxygen in the upper atmosphere, surface temperatures ranging from −110 °C to +13 °C, surface pressures of 5.5 to 6 mb, water vapor concentrations 5000 times less than in Earth's atmosphere, the base of the ionosphere starting at 80 to 110 km altitude, and grains from dust storms as high as 7 km in the atmosphere. The images and data enabled creation of surface relief maps, and gave information on the Martian gravity and magnetic fields.

== Lander ==
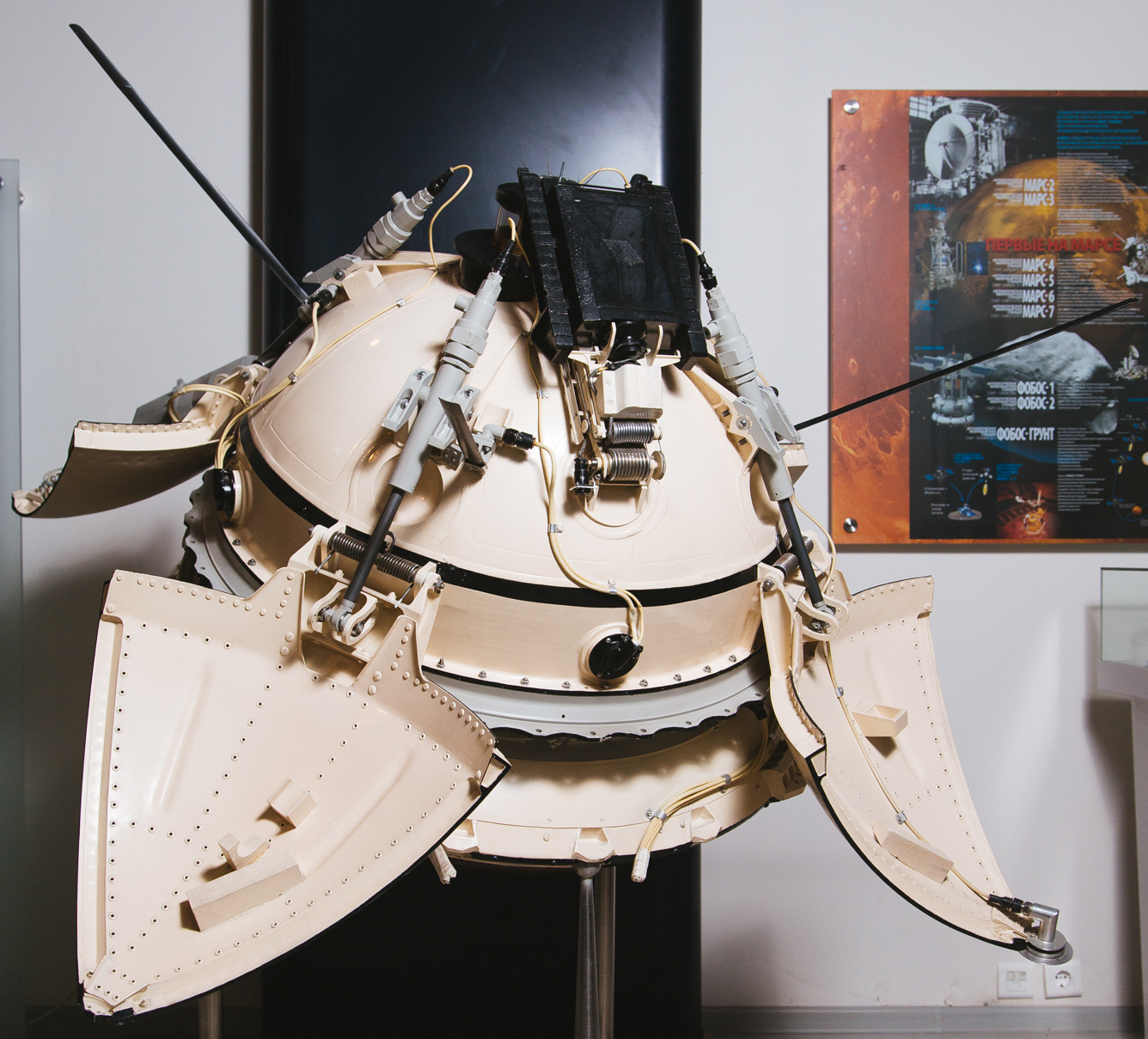
Mars 3 Lander model at the Memorial Museum of Cosmonautics in Moscow

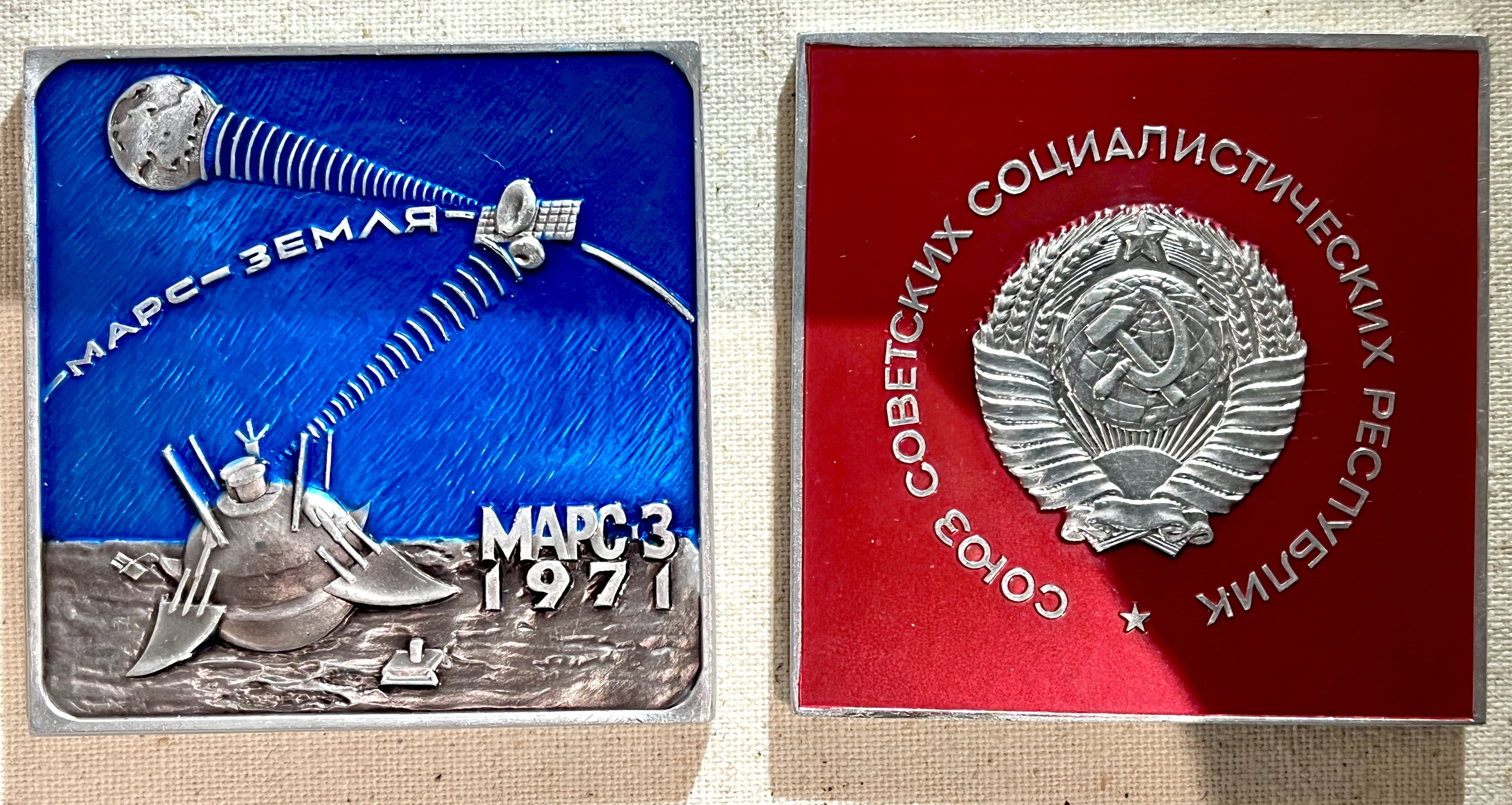
Commemorative plaques at the Memorial Museum of Cosmonautics in Moscow

=== Lander spacecraft system ===
The Mars 3 descent module was mounted on the bus/orbiter opposite the propulsion system. It consisted of a spherical 1.2 m diameter landing capsule, a 2.9 m diameter conical aerodynamic braking shield, a parachute system and retro-rockets.

The entire descent module had a fueled mass of 1210 kg, the spherical landing capsule accounted for 358 kg of this. An automatic control system consisting of gas micro-engines and pressurized nitrogen containers provided attitude control. Four solid-fuel motors were mounted to the outer edge of the cone to control pitch and yaw.

The main and auxiliary parachutes, the engine to initiate the landing, and the radar altimeter were mounted on the top section of the lander. Foam was used to absorb shock within the descent module. The landing capsule had four triangular petals which would open after landing, righting the spacecraft and exposing the instrumentation.

The lander was equipped with two television cameras with a 360 degree view of the surface as well as a mass spectrometer to study atmospheric composition; temperature, pressure, and wind sensors; and devices to measure mechanical and chemical properties of the surface, including a mechanical scoop to search for organic materials and signs of life. It also contained a pennant with the Soviet coat of arms.

Four aerials protruded from the top of the sphere to provide communications with the orbiter via an onboard radio system. The equipment was powered by batteries which were charged by the orbiter prior to separation. Temperature control was maintained through thermal insulation and a system of radiators. The landing capsule was sterilized before launch to prevent contamination of the martian environment.

==== PrOP-M rover ====
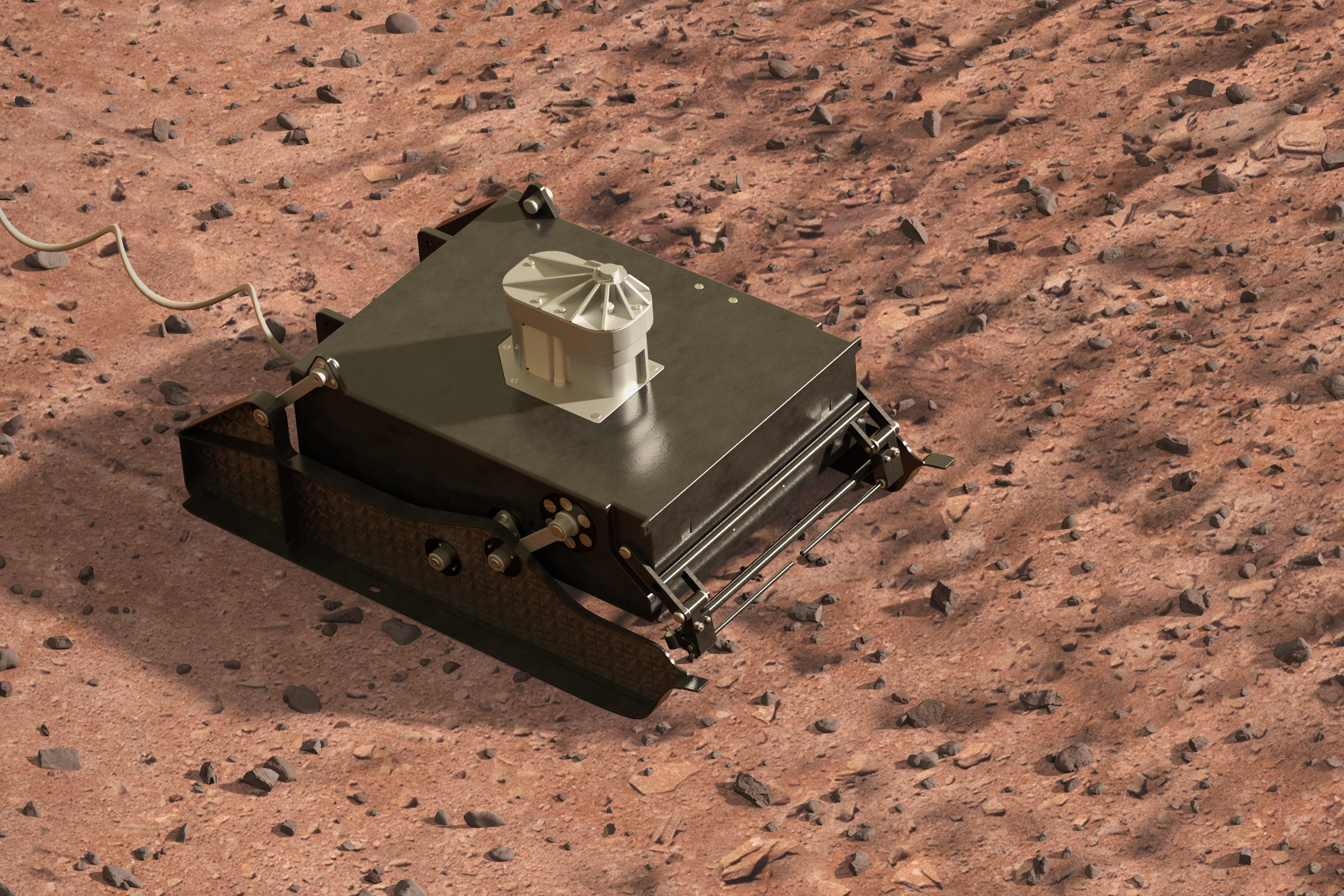
Rendering of the PrOP-M

Mars 3 lander had a small 4.5 kg Mars rover on board, which would move across the surface on skis while connected to the lander with a 15-meter umbilical. Two small metal rods were used for autonomous obstacle avoidance, as radio signals from Earth would take too long to drive the rovers using remote control. The rover carried a dynamic penetrometer and a radiation densitometer.

The main PrOP-M frame was a square box with a small protrusion at the center. The frame was supported on two wide flat skis, one extending down from each side elevating the frame slightly above the surface.

The rover was planned to be placed on the surface after landing by a manipulator arm and to move in the field of view of the television cameras and stop to make measurements every 1.5 metres. The traces of movement in the Martian soil would also be recorded to determine material properties.

Due to communication loss it is unknown whether the rover was deployed.

=== Entry, descent, landing, transmission, and failure ===
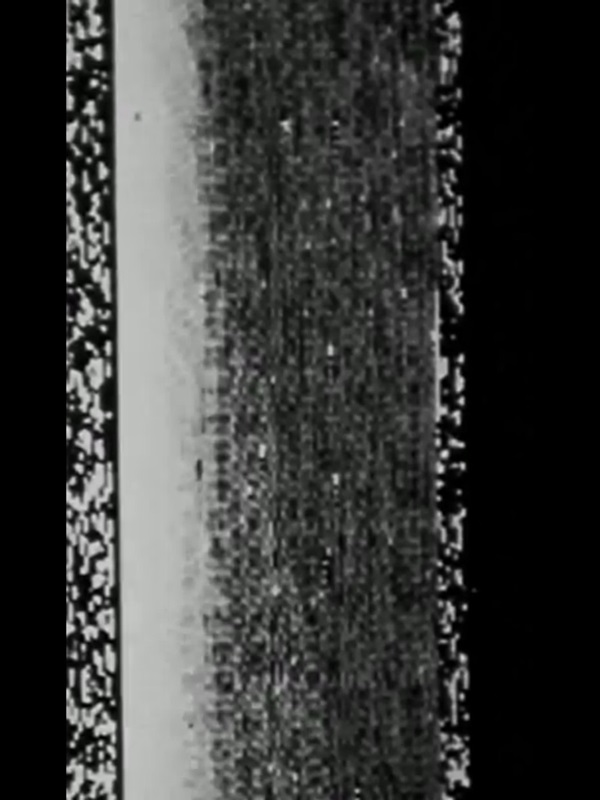
The only result received from the camera on Mars 3 lander.

Mars 3's descent module was released at 09:14 UT on December 2, 1971, 4 hours 35 minutes before reaching Mars. The descent module entered the Martian atmosphere at roughly 5.7 km/s. Through aerodynamic braking, parachutes, and retrorockets, the lander achieved a soft landing at 45°S 202°E and began operations.

The lander began transmitting to the Mars 3 orbiter 90 seconds after landing. After 20 seconds, transmission stopped for unknown reasons. It is not known whether the fault originated with the lander or the communications relay on the orbiter. The cause of the failure may have been related to the extremely powerful dust storm taking place at the time which may have induced a coronal discharge, damaging the communications system. The dust storm would also explain the poor image lighting.

A partial image (70 lines) was transmitted. According to V. G. Perminov, the lead designer for Mars and Venus spacecraft at the Lavochkin design bureau during the early days of Mars exploration, the image was "a gray background with no details".

=== Possible images of lander on Mars ===
On April 11, 2013, NASA announced that the Mars Reconnaissance Orbiter (MRO) may have imaged the Mars 3 lander hardware on the surface of Mars. The HiRISE camera on the MRO took images of what may be the parachute, retrorockets, heat shield and lander. This discovery was made by amateur space enthusiasts looking through publicly available archived images.

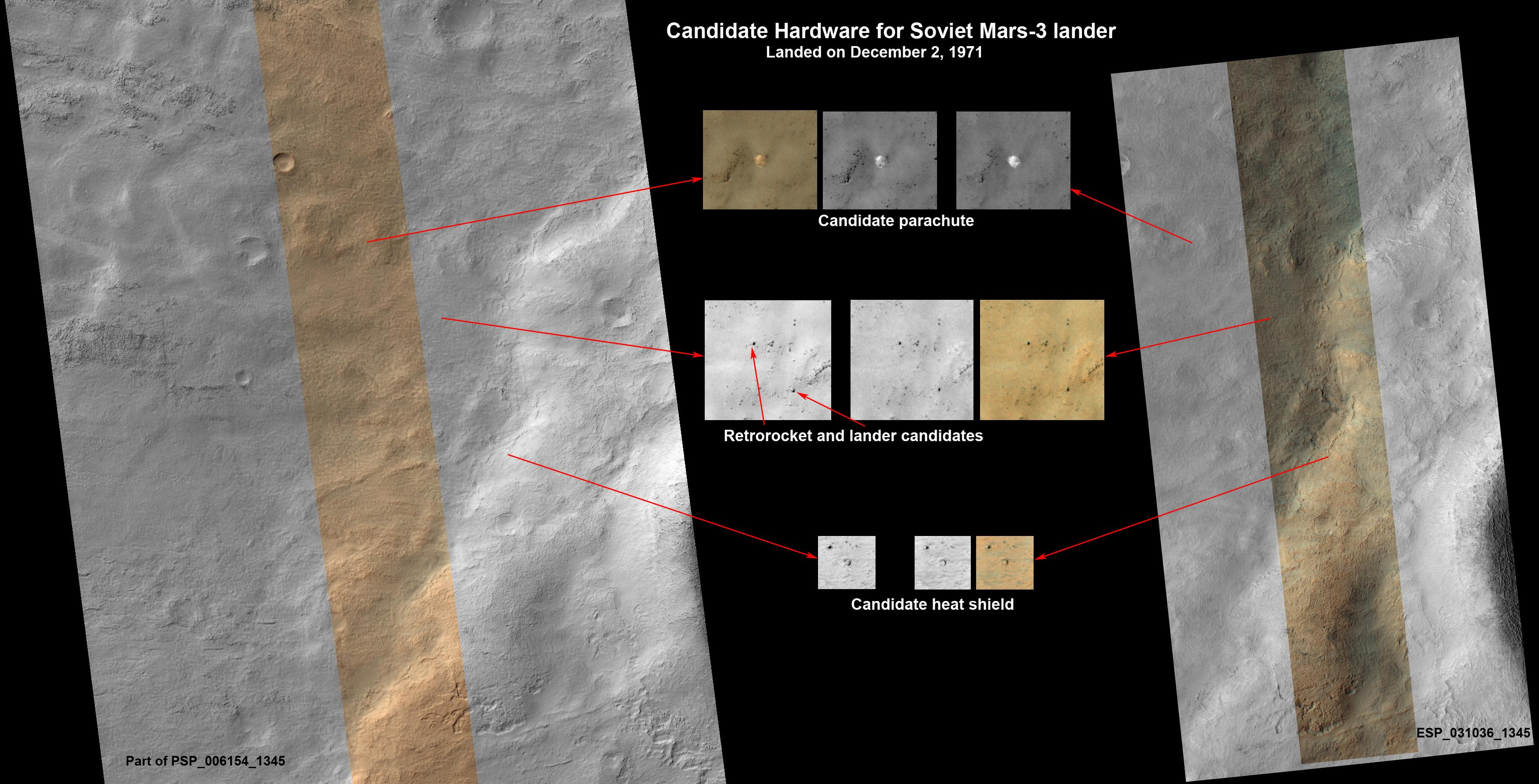
Candidate hardware for 1971 Soviet Mars 3 lander. The predicted landing site was at latitude 45 degrees south, longitude 202 degrees east, in Ptolemaeus Crater (images: HiRISE, MRO - November 2007/left & 10 March 2013/right).

== See also ==
- List of Mars orbiters
- List of missions to Mars
- Mars 1M
- Robotic space mission
- Space exploration
- Timeline of artificial satellites and space probes
