= Mars 2 =

Soviet orbiter and lander mission to Mars (1971–1972)

- Mission type: Mars orbiter/lander
- Operator: Soviet space program
- COSPAR ID: 1971-045A; 1971-045D
- SATCAT no.: 5234; 5739
- Mission duration: 1 year, 3 months and 3 days

Spacecraft properties
- Spacecraft type: 4M No. 171
- Manufacturer: OKB-1
- Launch mass: Total: 4,650 kg (10,250 lb); Orbiter: 3,440 kg (7,580 lb); Lander: 1,210 kg (2,670 lb)
- Landing mass: 358 kg (789 lb)
- Dry mass: 2,265 kg (4,993 lb)
- Dimensions: 4.1 × 2.0 × 5.9 m (13.5 × 6.6 × 19.4 ft)

Start of mission
- Launch date: 19 May 1971, 16:22:44 UTC
- Rocket: Proton-K/D
- Launch site: Baikonur 81/24
- Contractor: Khrunichev

End of mission
- Disposal: Decommissioned
- Declared: August 22, 1972
- Last contact: July 1972

Orbital parameters
- Reference system: Areocentric
- Periareion altitude: 1,380 km (860 mi)
- Apoareion altitude: 24,940 km (15,500 mi)
- Inclination: 48.9°
- Period: 18 hours

Mars orbiter
- Orbital insertion: 27 November 1971
- Orbits: 362

Mars impact (failed landing)
- Impact date: 27 November 1971
- Impact site: 45°S 47°E
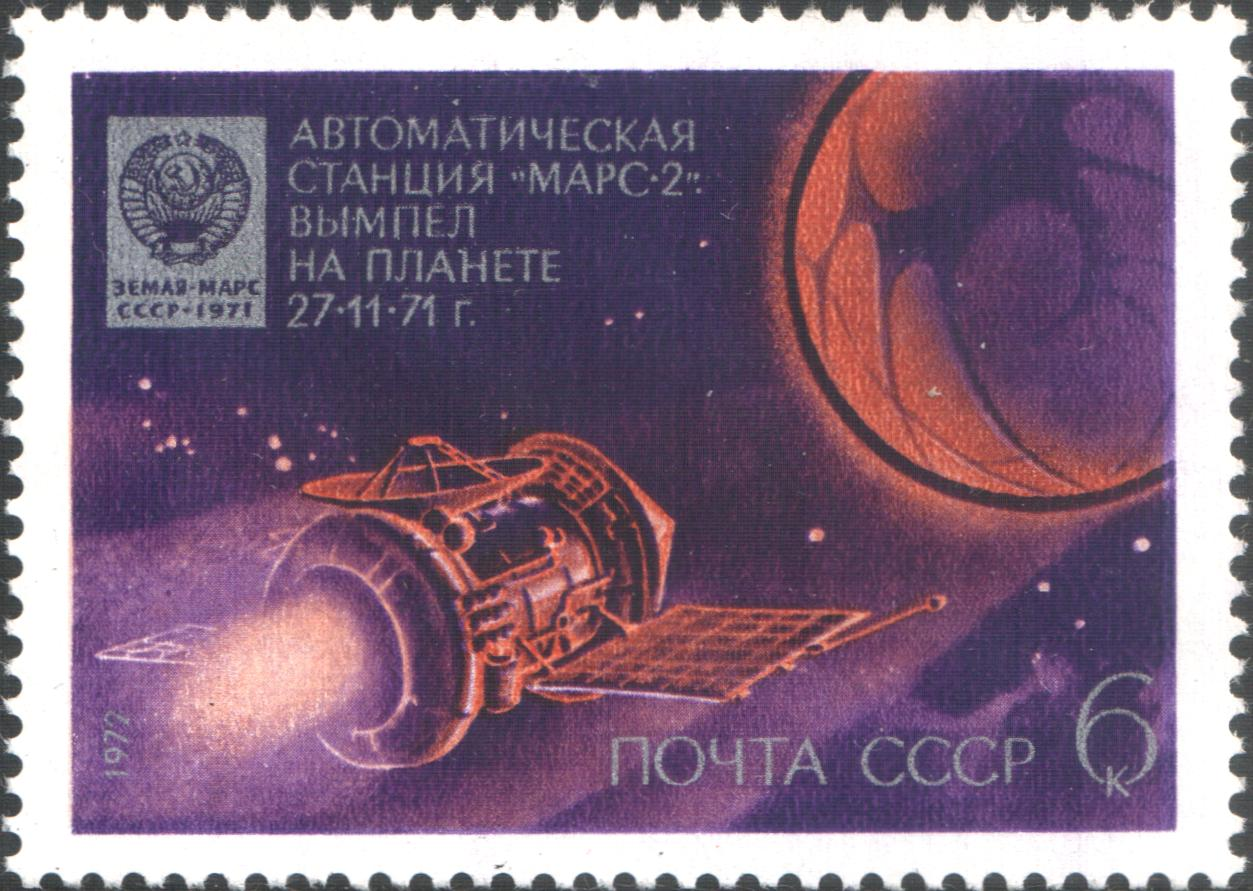
- Mars 2 stamp Mars program

The Mars 2 was an uncrewed space probe of the Mars program, a series of uncrewed Mars landers and orbiters launched by the Soviet Union beginning 19 May 1971.

The Mars 2 and Mars 3 missions consisted of identical spacecraft, each with an orbiter and an attached lander. The orbiter is identical to the Venera 9 bus. The type of bus/orbiter is the 4MV. They were launched by a Proton-K heavy launch vehicle with a Blok D upper stage. The lander of Mars 2 became the first human-made object to reach the surface of Mars, although the landing system failed and the lander was lost.

== Overview ==
- Launch Date/Time:
  - Mars 2: 19 May 1971 at 16:22:44 UTC
- Launch mass (including fuel):
  - Combined: 4,650 kg (10,250 lb)
  - Orbiter: 3,440 kg (7,580 lb)
  - Lander: 1,210 kg (2,670 lb)
- On-orbit dry mass: 2,265 kg (4,993 lb)
- Dimensions: 4.1 m (13.5 ft) tall, 2 m (6.6 ft) across (5.9 m (19.4 ft) across with solar panels deployed)

== Launch ==
On 19 May 1971, the Proton-K heavy launch vehicle launched the probe from Baikonur Cosmodrome. After the first stage separated the second stage was ignited. The third stage engine blasted Mars 2 into parking orbit, then the Blok D upper stage sent Mars 2 on the trans-Mars trajectory.

== Orbiter ==
The Orbiter type was the 4MV, used also for Mars-3 and later Mars and Venera Probes. The orbiter engine performed a burn to put the spacecraft into a 1,380-by-2,494-kilometre (857 mi × 1,550 mi), 18-hour orbit about Mars with an inclination of 48.9 degrees. Scientific instruments were generally turned on for about 30 minutes near periapsis.

The orbiter's primary scientific objectives were to image the Martian surface and clouds, determine the temperature on Mars, study the topography, composition and physical properties of the surface, measure properties of the atmosphere, monitor the solar wind and the interplanetary and Martian magnetic fields, and act as a communications relay to send signals from the landers to the Earth.

By coincidence, a particularly large dust storm on Mars adversely affected the mission. When Mariner 9 arrived and successfully orbited Mars on 14 November 1971, just two weeks prior to Mars 2 and Mars 3, planetary scientists were surprised to find the atmosphere was thick with "a planet-wide robe of dust, the largest storm ever observed." The surface was totally obscured. Unable to reprogram the mission computers, both Mars 2 and Mars 3 dispatched their landers immediately, and the orbiters used up a significant portion of their available data resources in snapping images of the featureless dust clouds below, rather than the surface mapping intended.

The Mars 2 orbiter sent back data covering the period from December 1971 to March 1972, although transmissions continued through August. It was announced that Mars 2 and Mars 3 had completed their missions by 22 August 1972, after 362 orbits. The probe, combined with Mars 3, sent back a total of 60 pictures. The images and data revealed mountains as high as 22 kilometres (14 mi), atomic hydrogen and oxygen in the upper atmosphere, surface temperatures ranging from −110 to 13 °C (−166 to 55 °F), surface pressures of 5.5 to 6 mbar (0.55 to 0.6 kPa), water vapor concentrations 5,000 times less than in the Earth's atmosphere, the base of the ionosphere starting at 80 to 110 kilometres (50 to 68 mi) altitude, and grains from dust storms as high as 7 kilometres (4.3 mi) in the atmosphere. The images and data enabled the creation of surface relief maps, and gave information on Martian gravity and magnetic fields. The orbiter remains in Martian orbit.

== Lander ==
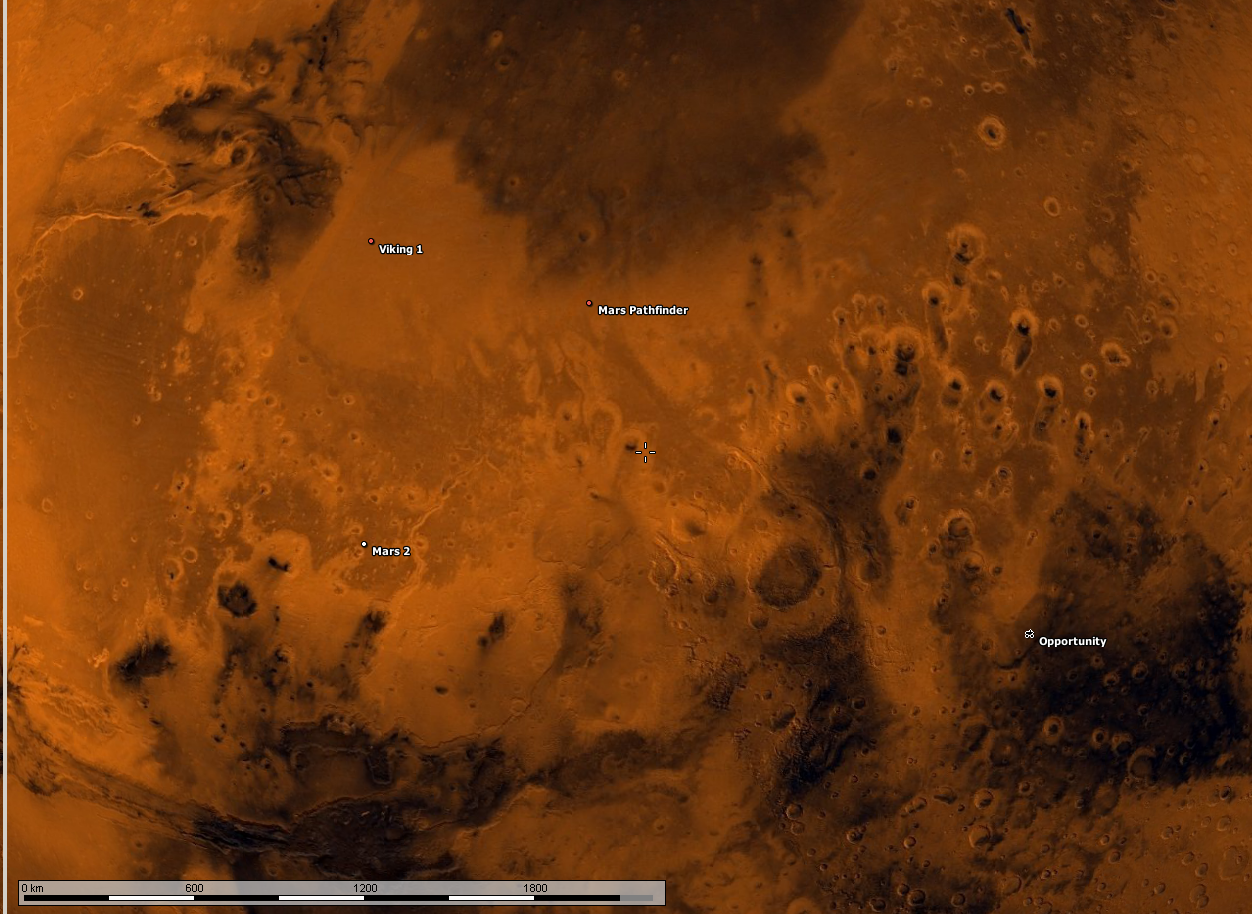
Map of Mars, showing the location of Mars 2 center left, in relation to Viking 1, Mars Pathfinder and Opportunity

=== Lander spacecraft system ===
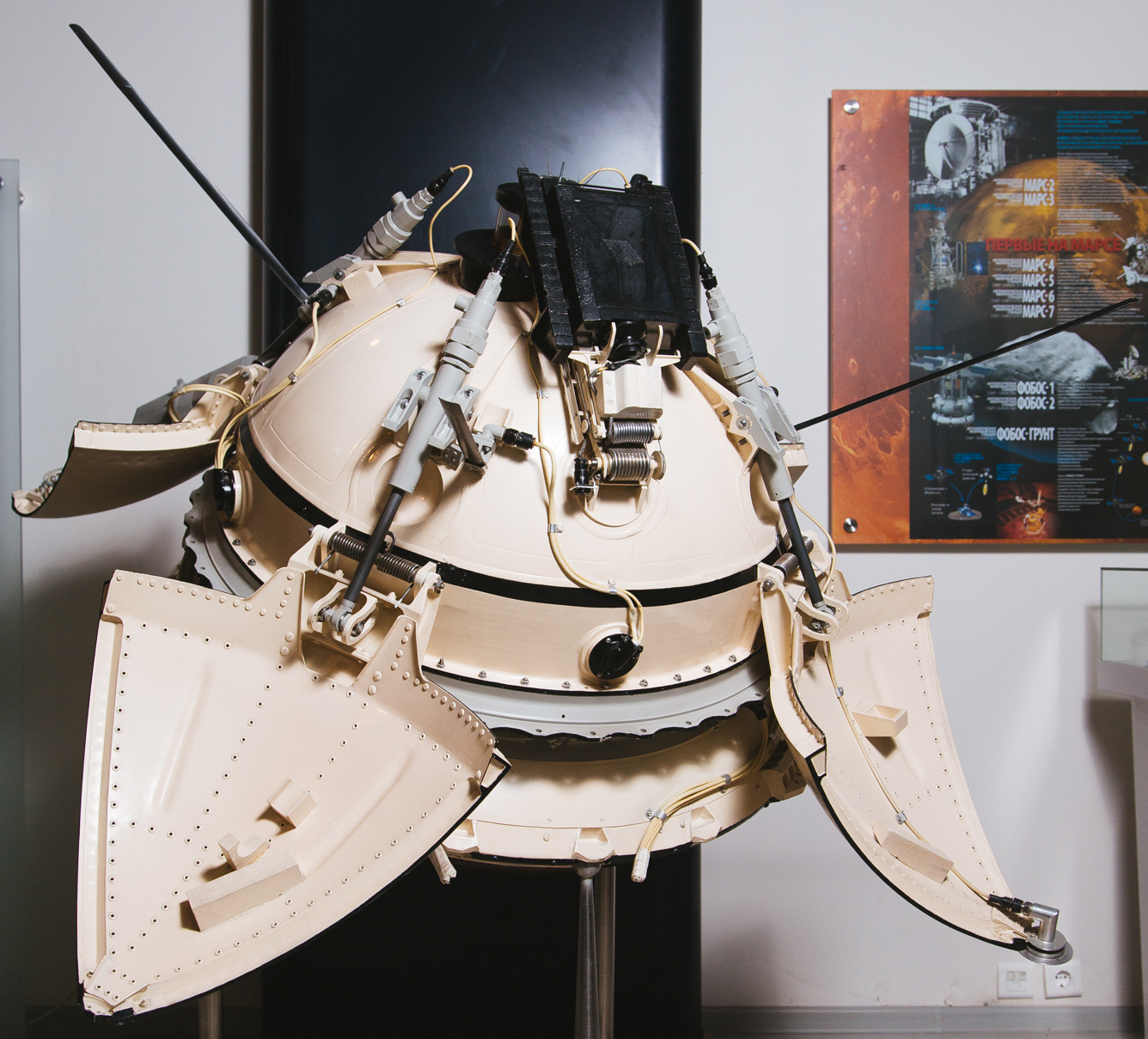
Mars 3 Lander model at the Memorial Museum of Cosmonautics in Moscow

The Mars 2 descent module was mounted on the bus/orbiter opposite the propulsion system. It consisted of a spherical 1.2 metres (3 ft 11 in) diameter landing capsule, a 2.9 metres (9 ft 6 in) diameter conical aerodynamic braking shield, a parachute system and retro-rockets.

The entire descent module had a fueled mass of 1,210 kilograms (2,670 lb), the spherical landing capsule accounting for 358 kilograms (789 lb) of this. An automatic control system consisting of gas micro-engines and pressurised nitrogen containers provided attitude control. Four "gunpowder" engines were mounted to the outer edge of the cone to control pitch and yaw.

The main and auxiliary parachutes, the engine to initiate the landing, and the radar altimeter were mounted on the top section of the lander. Foam was used to absorb shock within the descent module. The landing capsule had four triangular petals which would open after landing, righting the spacecraft and exposing the instrumentation.

The lander was equipped with two television cameras with a 360 degree view of the surface as well as a mass spectrometer to study atmospheric composition; temperature, pressure, and wind sensors; and devices to measure mechanical and chemical properties of the surface, including a mechanical scoop to search for organic materials and signs of life. It also contained a pennant with the State Emblem of the Soviet Union.

Four aerials protruded from the top of the sphere to provide communications with the orbiter via an onboard radio system. The equipment was powered by batteries which were charged by the orbiter prior to separation. Temperature control was maintained through thermal insulation and a system of radiators. The landing capsule was sterilised before launch to prevent contamination of the Martian environment.

==== PrOP-M rover ====
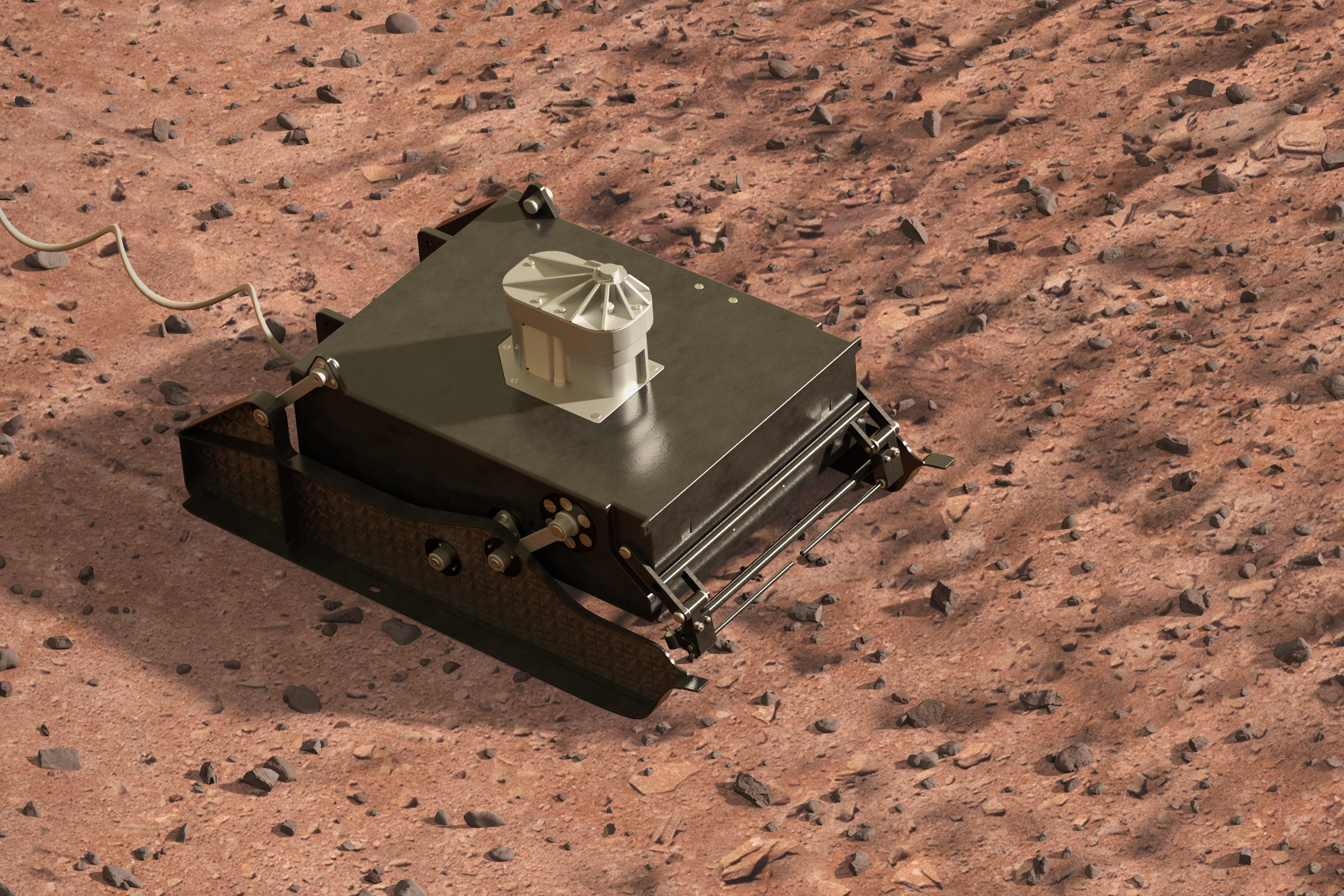
Rendering of the PrOP-M

Mars 2 lander had a small 4.5 kilograms (9.9 lb) Mars rover on board, which would move across the surface on skis while connected to the lander with a 15-metre (49 ft) umbilical. Two small metal rods were used for autonomous obstacle avoidance, as radio signals from Earth would take too long to drive the rovers using remote control. The rover carried a dynamic penetrometer and a radiation densitometer.

The main PrOP-M frame was a square box with a small protrusion at the center. The frame was supported on two wide flat skis, one extending down from each side elevating the frame slightly above the surface.

The rover was planned to be placed on the surface after landing by a manipulator arm and to move in the field of view of the television cameras and stop to make measurements every 1.5 metres (4 ft 11 in). The traces of movement in the Martian soil would also be recorded to determine material properties.

Because of the demise of the lander, the rover was not deployed.

=== Entry, descent, and crash landing ===
The descent module separated from the orbiter on 27 November 1971 about 4.5 hours before reaching Mars. After entering the atmosphere at approximately 6 km/s, the descent system on the module malfunctioned, possibly because the angle of entry was too steep. The descent sequence did not operate as planned and the parachute did not deploy. The descent module became the first man-made object to impact the surface of Mars. The exact crash site is unknown, but it is estimated to be at 45°S 313°W. Attempts to contact the probe after the crash were unsuccessful.

== See also ==
- List of Mars orbiters
- List of missions to Mars
- Mars 1M
- Mars program
- Space exploration
- Timeline of artificial satellites and space probes
- Robotic spacecraft
