= Baikonur Cosmodrome Site 81 =

Launchpad used by Roscosmos, primarily for Proton rockets

Coordinates: 46°04′15″N 62°59′05″E

Site 81
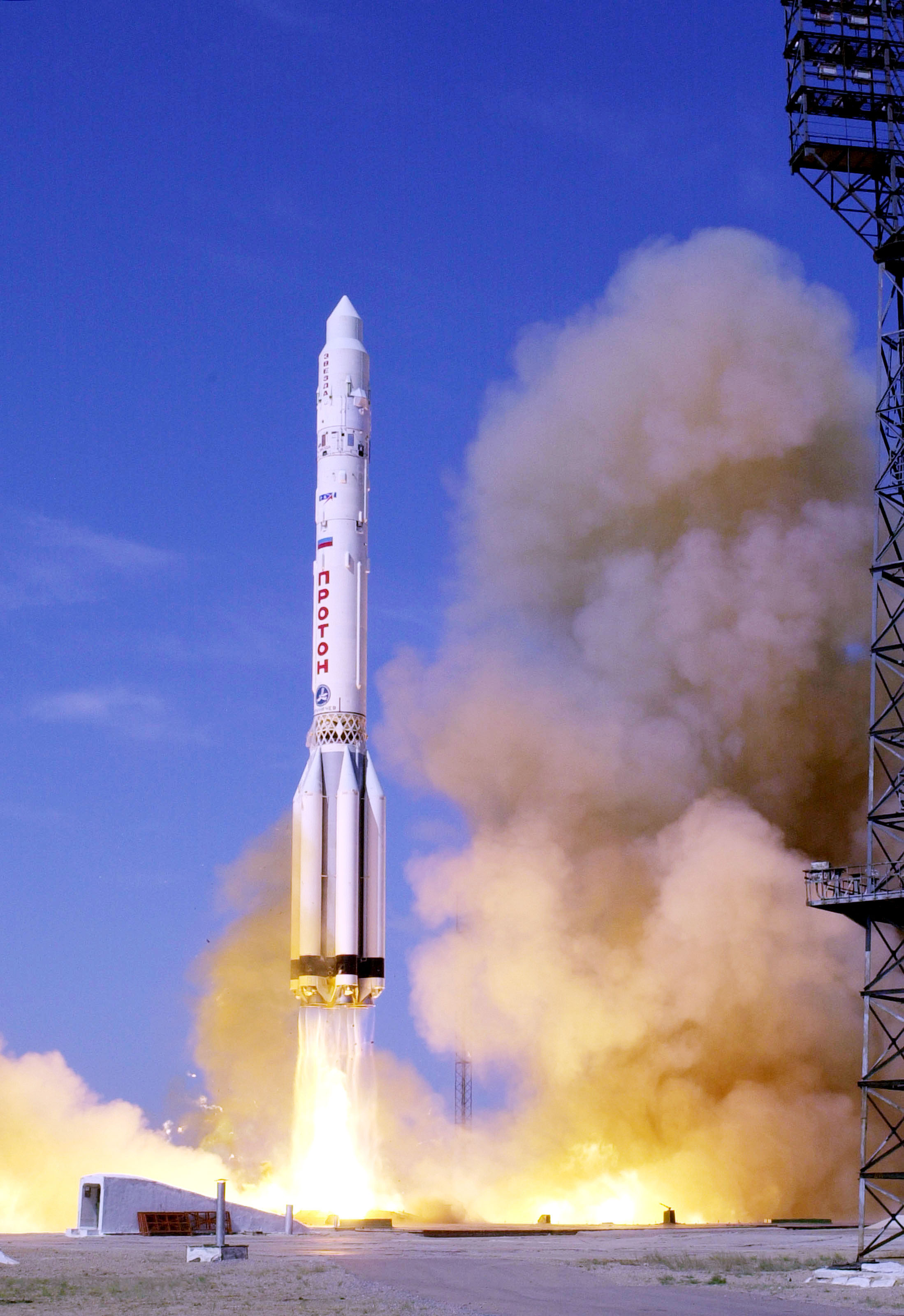
- A Proton-K with the Zvezda Service Module of the International Space Station during launch from LC-81/23.
- Interactive map of Site 81
- Launch site: Baikonur Cosmodrome
- Operator: RVSN, VKS, RKA
- Total launches: 196
- Launch pad: 2
- Orbital inclination range: 49° – 99°
Site 81/23 launch history
- Status: Inactive
- Launches: 104
- First launch: 16 July 1965; UR-500 / Proton 1
- Last launch: 27 March 2004; Proton-K/DM-2 / Globus No.17L
- Associated rockets: UR-500 (retired); Proton-K (retired)
Site 81/24 launch history
- Status: Active
- Launches: 92
- First launch: 22 November 1967; Proton-K/D / Soyuz 7K-L1 No.5L
- Last launch: 12 February 2026; Proton-M/DM-03 / Elektro-L №5
- Associated rockets: Proton-K (retired); Proton-M (active)

Site 81 at the Baikonur Cosmodrome is a launch site used, along with Site 200, by Proton rockets. It consists of two launch pads, areas 23 and 24. Area 24 is used for Proton-K and Proton-M launches, while Area 23 is inactive.

Several planetary probes have been launched from Site 81. Area 23 was used to launch Mars 3, Mars 4, Mars 6 and Venera 11, whilst Area 24 was used by Mars 2, Mars 5, Mars 7, Venera 9, Venera 10 and Venera 12. Several Luna probes were also launched from both areas.

The Zarya and Zvezda modules of the International Space Station, as well as Salyut 2, 3 and 5, and the Spektr and Priroda modules of Mir, were launched from Area 23. Area 24 was used to launch Salyut 1, 4 and 6.

On 2 July 2013, a Proton-M/DM-03 launched from Site 81/24 carrying three GLONASS navigation satellites. Immediately after liftoff, the rocket began to pitch over, and rolled out of control. The rocket fell close to the launch pad and exploded, the extent of any damage to Site 81 or the Baikonur Cosmodrome is unclear.

On 25 February 2020, Roscosmos announced that Site 81/24 will be deactivated by late 2022 or early 2023; any remaining Proton-M launches on the manifest after that time will be transferred to Site 200/39.
