= Parking orbit =

Temporary orbit used during the launch of a spacecraft

A parking orbit is a temporary orbit used during the launch of a spacecraft. A launch vehicle follows a trajectory to the parking orbit, then coasts for a while, then engines fire again to enter the final desired trajectory.

An alternative trajectory that is used on some missions is direct injection, where the rocket fires continuously (except during staging) until its fuel is exhausted, ending with the payload on the final trajectory. This technique was first used by the Soviet Venera 1 mission to Venus in 1961.

== Reasons for use ==
=== Geostationary spacecraft ===
Geostationary spacecraft require an orbit in the plane of the equator. Getting there requires a geostationary transfer orbit with an apogee directly above the equator. Unless the launch site itself is quite close to the equator, it requires an impractically large amount of fuel to launch a spacecraft directly into such an orbit. Instead, the craft is placed with an upper stage in an inclined parking orbit. When the craft crosses the equator, the upper stage is fired to raise the spacecraft's apogee to geostationary altitude (and often reduce the inclination of the transfer orbit, as well). Finally, a circularization burn is required to raise the perigee to the same altitude and remove any remaining inclination.

=== Translunar or interplanetary spacecraft ===
Parking orbit for one of the early Ranger missions to the Moon. Note that the launch angle varies depending on the launch time within the launch window.

In order to reach the Moon or a planet at a desired time, the spacecraft must be launched within a limited range of times known as a launch window. Using a preliminary parking orbit before final injection can widen this window from seconds or minutes, to several hours. For the Apollo program's crewed lunar missions, a parking orbit allowed time for spacecraft checkout while still close to home, before committing to the lunar trip.

== Design challenges ==
The use of a parking orbit can lead to a number of technical challenges. For example, during the development Centaur upper stage, the following problems were noted and had to be addressed:

- The injection burn occurs under zero g conditions.
- If the same upper stage which performs the parking orbit injection is used for the final injection burn, a restartable liquid-propellant rocket engine is required.
- During the parking orbit coast, the propellants will drift away from the bottom of the tank and the pump inlets. This must be dealt with through the use of tank diaphragms, or ullage rockets to settle the propellant back to the bottom of the tank.
- A reaction control system is needed to orient the stage properly for the final burn, and perhaps to establish a suitable thermal orientation during coast.
- Cryogenic propellants must be stored in well-insulated tanks, to prevent excessive boiloff during coast.
- Battery life and other consumables must be sufficient for the duration of the parking coast and final injection.

The Centaur and Agena families of upper stages were designed for restarts and have often been used in missions using parking orbits. The last Agena flew in 1987, but Centaur is still in production. The Briz-M is also capable of coasts and restarts, and often performs the same role for Russian rockets.

== Examples ==
- The Apollo program used parking orbits, for all the reasons mentioned above except those that pertain to geostationary orbits.
- When the Space Shuttle orbiter launched interplanetary probes such as Galileo, it used a parking orbit to deliver the probe to the right injection spot.
- The Ariane 5 does not usually use parking orbits. This simplifies the launcher since multiple restarts are not needed, and the penalty is small for their typical GTO mission, as their launch site is close to the equator. A less commonly used second stage, the Ariane-5ES has multiple restart capability, and has been used for missions such as the Automated Transfer Vehicle (ATV) that use parking orbits. The Ariane 6 upper stage supports multiple restarts and can be used with missions that require parking orbits.
- In a literal example of a parking orbit, the Automated Transfer Vehicle could park for several months in orbit while waiting to rendezvous with the International Space Station. For safety reasons, the ATV could not approach the station while a Space Shuttle was docked or when a Soyuz or Progress was maneuvering to dock or depart.
