= Outline of the Solar System =

Overview of and topical guide to the Solar System

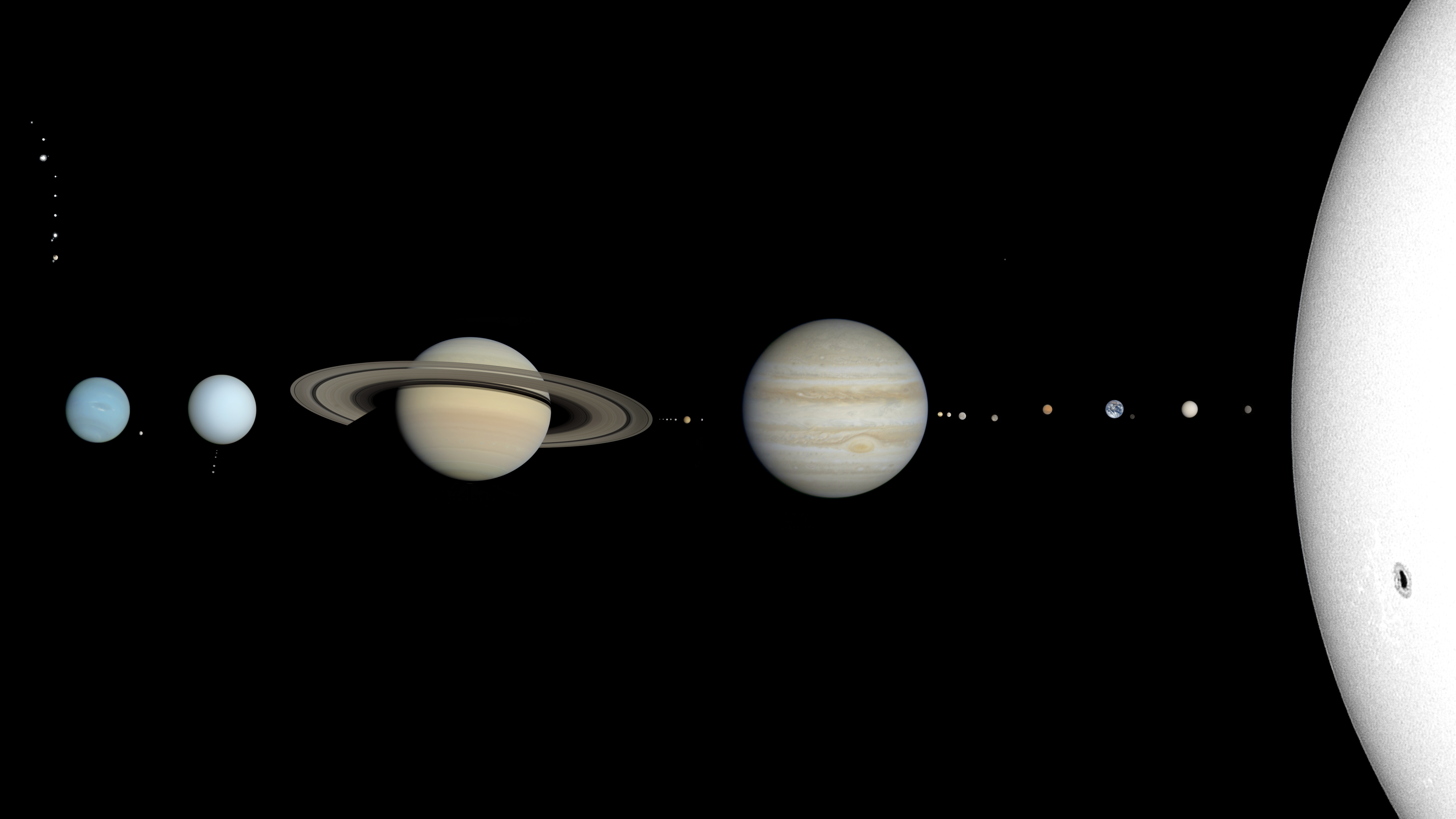
The Sun, planets, moons and dwarf planets (true color, size to scale, distances not to scale)

The following outline is provided as an overview of and topical guide to the Solar System:

Solar System – gravitationally bound system comprising the Sun and the objects that orbit it, either directly or indirectly. Of those objects that orbit the Sun directly, the largest eight are the planets (including Earth), with the remainder being significantly smaller objects, such as dwarf planets and small Solar System bodies. Of the objects that orbit the Sun indirectly, the moons, two are larger than the smallest planet, Mercury.

== Regions and celestial objects of the Solar System ==
Planets and declared dwarf planets of the Solar System. Sizes are to scale. Distances from the Sun are not to scale.

- Sun ☉
  - Solar wind
- Interplanetary medium
- Inner Solar System
  - Inner planets
    - Mercury ☿
    - Venus ♀
    - Earth 🜨
      - The Moon ☾
      - Near-Earth objects
      - Van Allen radiation belt
    - Mars ♂
      - Moons of Mars
  - Asteroid belt
    - Asteroid groups
    - Asteroids
      - Ceres ⚳
      - Pallas ⚴
      - Juno ⚵
      - Vesta ⚶
      - Hygiea
      - Active asteroids
    - Kirkwood gaps
- Outer Solar System
  - Outer planets
    - Jupiter ♃
      - Moons of Jupiter
        - Io
        - Europa
        - Ganymede
        - Callisto
      - Rings of Jupiter
      - Magnetosphere of Jupiter
      - Jupiter trojans
    - Saturn ♄
      - Moons of Saturn
        - Mimas
        - Enceladus
        - Tethys
        - Dione
        - Rhea
        - Titan
        - Iapetus
      - Rings of Saturn
      - Shepherd moons
      - Magnetosphere of Saturn
    - Uranus ⛢
      - Moons of Uranus
        - Miranda
        - Ariel
        - Umbriel
        - Titania
        - Oberon
      - Rings of Uranus
    - Neptune ♆
      - Moons of Neptune
        - Triton
      - Rings of Neptune
  - Trojans
  - Centaurs
- Ubiquitous
  - Comets ☄
  - Meteoroids
  - Micrometeoroids
  - Cosmic dust
  - Interplanetary dust cloud
- Trans-Neptunian region
  - Trans-Neptunian objects
  - Kuiper belt
    - Pluto ♇
      - Moons of Pluto
        - Charon
    - Haumea
      - Moons of Haumea
      - Ring of Haumea
    - Makemake
      - Moon of Makemake
    - Quaoar
      - Moon of Quaoar
      - Rings of Quaoar
    - Orcus
      - Moon of Orcus
  - Scattered disc
    - Eris
      - Moon of Eris
    - Gonggong
      - Moon of Gonggong
- Farthest regions
  - Extreme trans-Neptunian objects
  - Detached objects
    - Sedna
    - Leleākūhonua
  - Oort cloud
  - Heliosphere
    - Heliopause
    - Boundaries

== Location of the Solar System ==
From largest to smallest structure:

- Universe
- Observable universe
- Pisces–Cetus Supercluster Complex
- Laniakea Supercluster
- Virgo Supercluster
- Local Sheet
- Local Group
- Milky Way subgroup
- Milky Way
- Orion–Cygnus Arm
- Gould Belt
- Local Bubble
- Local Interstellar Cloud – immediate galactic neighborhood of the Solar System.
  - Alpha Centauri – star system nearest to the Solar System, at about 4.4 light years away
- Solar System – star and planetary system where the Earth is located.
- Earth – the only planet known to have life.

== Structure and composition of the Solar System ==
- Interplanetary space
- Physical characteristics of the Sun
  - Structure of the Sun
    - Solar core
    - Radiative zone
    - Convection zone
    - Photosphere
    - Chromosphere
    - Corona
  - Solar granulation
  - Sunspots
  - Solar prominences
  - Solar flares
- Physical characteristics of Mercury
  - Structure of Mercury
  - Atmosphere of Mercury
  - Geology of Mercury
- Physical characteristics of Venus
  - Structure of Venus
  - Atmosphere of Venus
  - Geology of Venus
    - Volcanism on Venus
- Physical characteristics of the Earth
  - Figure of the Earth
  - Structure of the Earth
    - Earth's crust
    - Earth's mantle
    - Earth's outer core
    - Earth's inner core
  - Earth's magnetic field
  - Atmosphere of Earth
  - Geology of Earth
    - Lithosphere of Earth
      - Plate tectonics
  - Hydrosphere of Earth
    - Water distribution on Earth
    - Tides
- Physical characteristics of Mars
  - Structure of Mars
  - Atmosphere of Mars
  - Geology of Mars
    - Volcanism on Mars
  - Geography of Mars
  - Water on Mars
- Physical characteristics of Jupiter
  - Structure of Jupiter
  - Atmosphere of Jupiter
  - Great Red Spot
- Physical characteristics of Saturn
  - Structure of Saturn
  - Atmosphere of Saturn
  - Saturn's hexagon
- Physical characteristics of Uranus
  - Structure of Uranus
  - Atmosphere of Uranus
- Physical characteristics of Neptune
  - Structure of Neptune
  - Atmosphere of Neptune
  - Great Dark Spot

== History of the Solar System ==
- History of the Solar System

=== Discovery and exploration of the Solar System ===
Discovery and exploration of the Solar System –

- Timeline of Solar System astronomy
- Timeline of discovery of Solar System planets and their moons
- Timeline of Solar System exploration
- Timeline of first images of Earth from space
- Development of hypotheses
  - Geocentric model –
  - Heliocentrism –
  - Historical models of the Solar System
  - Planets beyond Neptune
  - List of former planets
  - List of hypothetical Solar System objects in astronomy
- Space exploration – Exploration by celestial body
  - Exploration of Mercury
  - Observations and explorations of Venus
  - Exploration of the Moon
  - Exploration of Mars
  - Exploration of Ceres
  - Exploration of Jupiter
  - Exploration of Saturn
  - Exploration of Uranus
  - Exploration of Neptune
  - Exploration of Pluto
- Solar System models

=== Formation and evolution of the Solar System ===
Formation and evolution of the Solar System –

- Nebular hypothesis
- Terrestrial planets
  - Iron planets
    - Mercury
  - Silicate planets
    - Geodynamics of Venus
    - History of Earth
      - Formation of Earth
    - Geological history of Mars
- Giant planets
  - Gas giants
    - Jupiter
    - Saturn
  - Ice giants
    - Uranus
    - Neptune

== Lists of Solar System objects and features ==
The number of currently known, or observed, objects of the Solar System are in the hundreds of thousands. Many of them are listed in the following articles:

=== By type ===
- List of Solar System objects
- List of gravitationally rounded objects of the Solar System
  - Planetary-mass object
- List of natural satellites
  - Planetary-mass moon
- List of possible dwarf planets
- List of minor planets (numbered) and List of unnumbered minor planets
- List of trans-Neptunian objects (numbered) and List of unnumbered trans-Neptunian objects
- Lists of comets

=== By physical parameters and features ===
- List of exceptional asteroids
- Lists of geological features of the Solar System
  - List of craters in the Solar System
- List of Solar System extremes
  - By size
    - List of Solar System objects by size
  - By distance
    - List of Solar System objects most distant from the Sun
    - List of Solar System objects by greatest aphelion
  - Features
    - List of tallest mountains in the Solar System
    - List of largest craters in the Solar System
    - List of largest rifts, canyons and valleys in the Solar System

== Lists of Solar System exploring missions and spacecraft ==
=== Missions ===
- List of missions to the Moon
- List of missions to Venus
- List of missions to Mars
- List of missions to the outer planets
- List of minor planets and comets visited by spacecraft
  - List of missions to minor planets
  - List of missions to comets

=== Spacecraft ===
- List of Solar System probes
  - List of artificial objects in heliocentric orbit
  - List of objects at Lagrange points
  - List of artificial objects leaving the Solar System
- List of lunar probes
  - Lunar Roving Vehicles
- List of extraterrestrial orbiters
  - List of Mars orbiters
- List of landings on extraterrestrial bodies
  - List of Mars landers
  - List of artificial objects on extraterrestrial surfaces
  - List of spacecraft intentionally crashed into extraterrestrial bodies
- List of rovers on extraterrestrial bodies

== See also ==
- Outline of astronomy
- Outline of space exploration
- Astronomical symbols
- Planetary mnemonic
- HIP 11915 (a solar analog whose planetary system contains a Jupiter analog)
