= Twardowski Lunar Mission =

- Mission type: Lunar orbiter / Resource mapping
- Operator: ESA / Creotech Instruments
- Website: Creotech Instruments
- Mission duration: Planned: 1–2 years (nominal)

Spacecraft properties
- Bus: HyperSat
- Manufacturer: Creotech Instruments
- Launch mass: Approx. 150 kg (330 lb)

Start of mission
- Launch date: Planned: 2029
- Launch site: TBA

Orbital parameters
- Reference system: Lunar
- Regime: Low Lunar Orbit
- Altitude: 100–300 km
- Inclination: ~90° (Polar)

The Twardowski Lunar Mission is a planned lunar orbiter being built by ESA & Creotech, a Polish company. With the University of Muenster & the Space Research Centre of the Polish Academy of Sciences (PAN) contributing too.

== Goals ==
It will:

- Map up to 98% of the moon.
- find elements such as Helium-3 & sulfur using infrared detectors.

== Launch & Preparation ==
It will launch in 2029. The company is also building a cleanroom for the satellite & other satellites. It is currently in Phase A, which started in January 2026 for nine months, with a value of EUR 500,000.

== Engineering ==
It is based on the HyperSat platform.
