= List of archaeological sites beyond national boundaries =

This list of archaeological sites beyond national boundaries presents archaeological sites that are not in any country. This includes sites in international waters and international territories such as Antarctica and extraterrestrial sites.

Site	Location	Nature	Status
Hektor Station	Deception Island, Antarctica	Whaling station	
The Titanic Wreck	off Newfoundland	Twentieth-century shipwreck	The ship is broken in two, with some remains scattered. Some looting has taken place.
SS Republic	about 100 miles (160 km) off the state of Georgia	Nineteenth-century shipwreck	A salvage effort in 2003 recovered about one-third of the rare 19th century gold and silver coins carried aboard, worth an estimated $75 million. Most of the hull of the ship is now gone, but the rudder, parts of the paddle wheel and the steam engine are still present.
Tranquility Base (Statio Tranquillitatis)	Mare Tranquillitatis, on the Moon	Site of first humans on the Moon	Virtually undisturbed. Ineligible for World Heritage status. The U.S. states of California and New Mexico have listed it on their heritage registers.

== See also ==
- List of artificial objects on extraterrestrial surfaces
- Space archaeology
