= List of artificial objects on extraterrestrial surfaces =

This is a partial list of artificial objects left on extraterrestrial surfaces.

== Artificial objects on other extraterrestrial bodies ==
Surface	Object	Mass	Owner	Landing	Location	Ref.
67P/Churyumov–Gerasimenko	Philae	100 kg (220 lb)	(Europe) (Germany) ESA/DLR	12 November 2014	"Abydos"	
67P/Churyumov–Gerasimenko	Rosetta	1,230 kg (2,710 lb)	(Europe) ESA	30 September 2016	"Sais"	
433 Eros	NEAR Shoemaker	487 kg (1,074 lb)	(United States) NASA/APL	12 February 2001	South of Himeros crater	
25143 Itokawa	Hayabusa target marker	0.6 kg (1.3 lb)	(Japan) JAXA	20 November 2005	Muses Sea	
Mercury	MESSENGER	1,108 kg (2,443 lb)	(United States) NASA/APL	30 April 2015	Suisei Planitia	
162173 Ryugu	MASCOT	9.6 kg (21 lb)	(France) (Germany) CNES/DLR	3 October 2018	Alice's Wonderland	
162173 Ryugu	MINERVA-II Rover-1A	1.1 kg (2.4 lb)	(Japan) JAXA	21 September 2018	Tritonis	
162173 Ryugu	MINERVA-II Rover-1B	1.1 kg (2.4 lb)	(Japan) JAXA	21 September 2018	Tritonis	
162173 Ryugu	MINERVA-II Rover-2	1.0 kg (2.2 lb)	(Japan) JAXA	October 2019	Unknown	
162173 Ryugu	Hayabusa2 Small Carry-on Impactor	2.5 kg (5.5 lb)	(Japan) JAXA	5 April 2019	"C01"	
162173 Ryugu	Hayabusa2 Deployable Camera 3	≈2.0 kg (4.4 lb)	(Japan) JAXA	April 2019	Unknown	
162173 Ryugu	Hayabusa2 Target Marker B	0.3 kg (0.66 lb)	(Japan) JAXA	25 October 2018	"L08"	
162173 Ryugu	Hayabusa2 Target Marker A	0.3 kg (0.66 lb)	(Japan) JAXA	30 May 2019	"S01"	
162173 Ryugu	Hayabusa2 Target Marker E	0.3 kg (0.66 lb)	(Japan) JAXA	September 2019	Unknown	
162173 Ryugu	Hayabusa2 Target Marker C	0.3 kg (0.66 lb)	(Japan) JAXA	September 2019	Unknown	
9P/Tempel	Deep Impact impactor	372 kg (820 lb)	(United States) NASA/JPL	4 July 2005		
Titan	Huygens lander	319 kg (703 lb)	(Europe) ESA	14 January 2005	Northeast of Adiri	
Titan	Huygens heat shield	Unknown	(Europe) ESA	14 January 2005	Northeast of Adiri	
Titan	Huygens parachute	Unknown	(Europe) ESA	14 January 2005	Northeast of Adiri	
Dimorphos	Double Asteroid Redirection Test impactor	570 kg (1,260 lb)	(United States) NASA/JHUAPL	26 September 2022		

== Estimated total masses of objects ==
Surface	Total estimated mass of objects (kg)	Total estimated local weight of objects (N)
Churyumov–Gerasimenko	100	?
Eros	487	?
Itokawa	0.591	?
Jupiter	2,564	59,400
Mars	10,240	37,833
Mercury	507.9	1,881
The Moon	218,829	36,181
Ryugu	18.5	?
Saturn	2,150	2,289.75
Tempel 1	370	2.5
Titan	319	372
Venus	22,642	201,256
Dimorphos	570	?
Total	259,073	613,725+

== Gallery ==
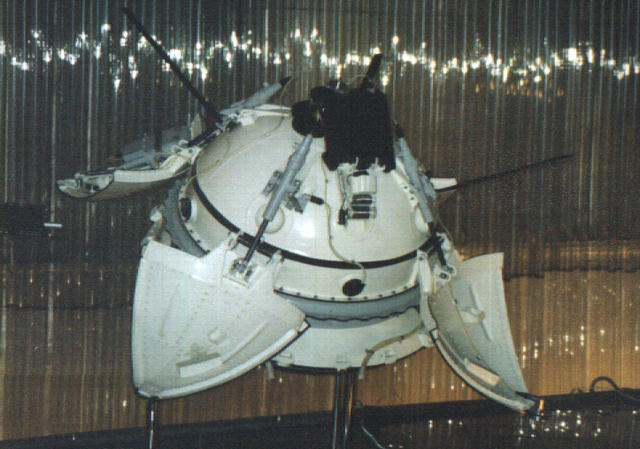
Mars 3 lander at the Memorial Museum of Cosmonautics in Russia

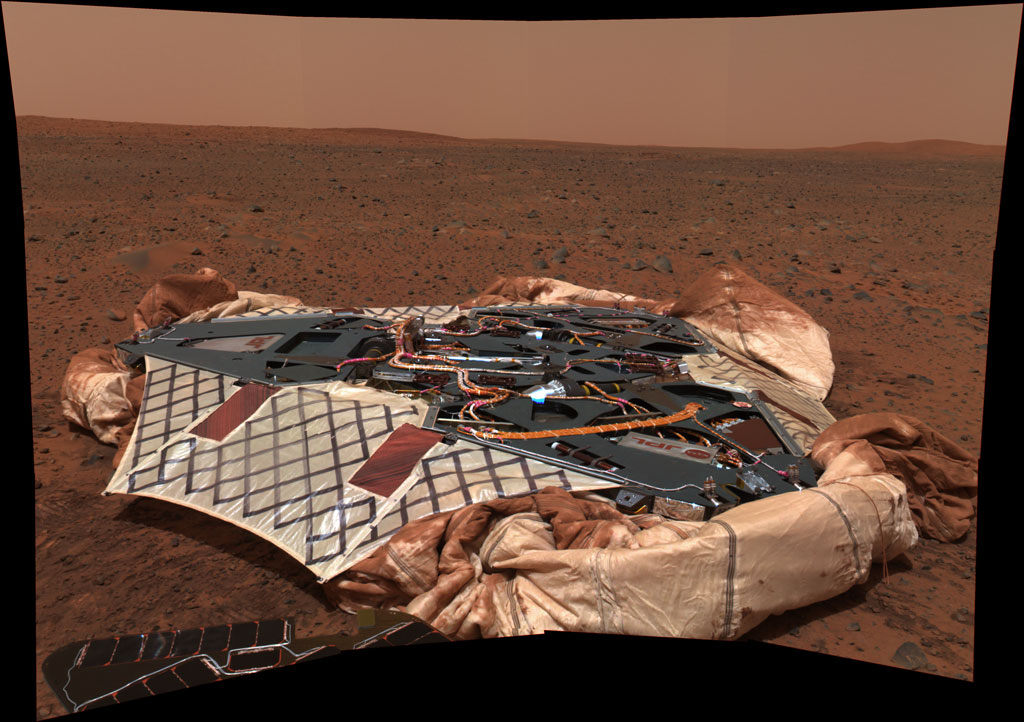
MER-A Spirit rover lander

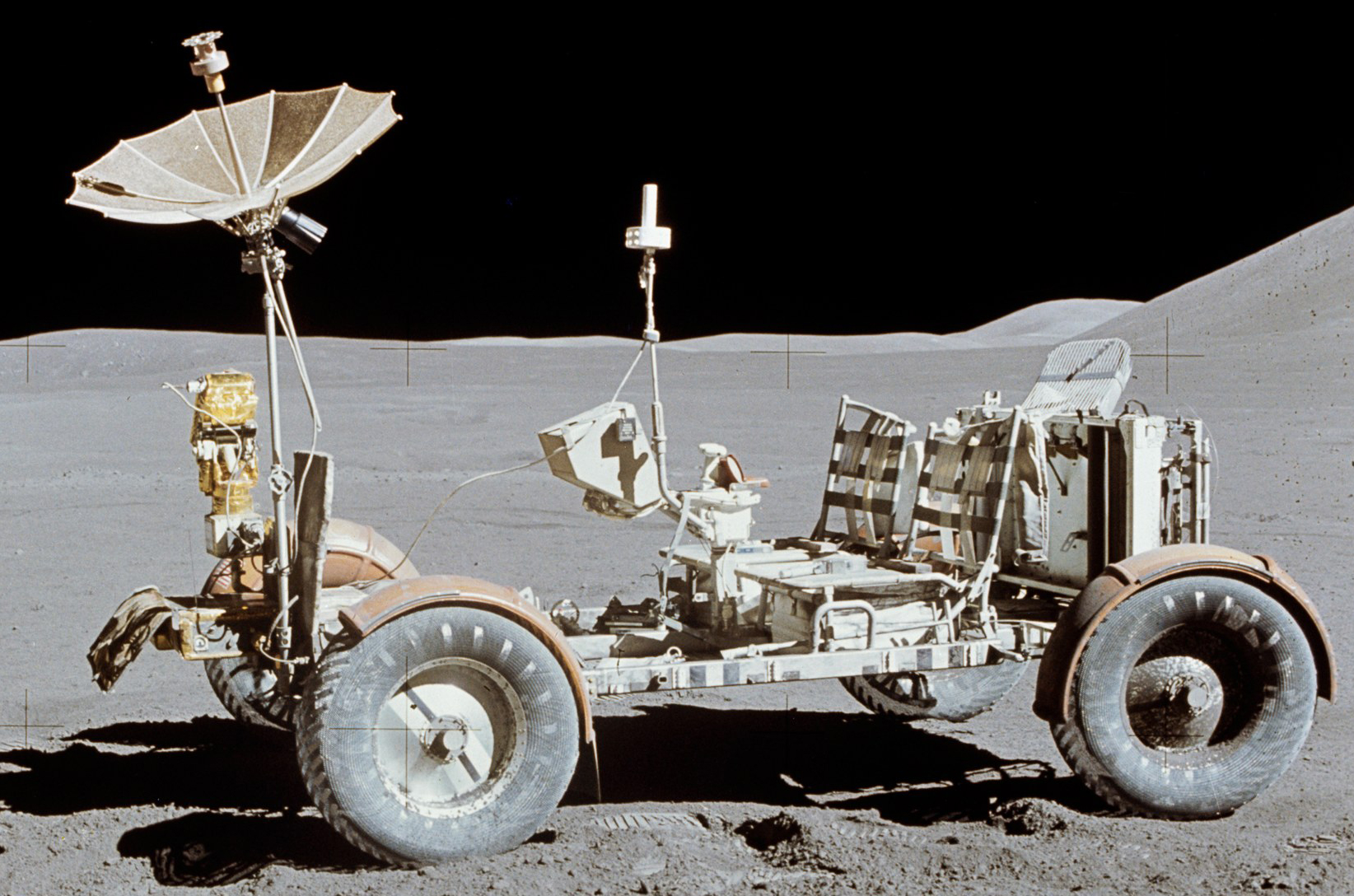
Apollo 15 Lunar Roving Vehicle in its final resting place on the Moon

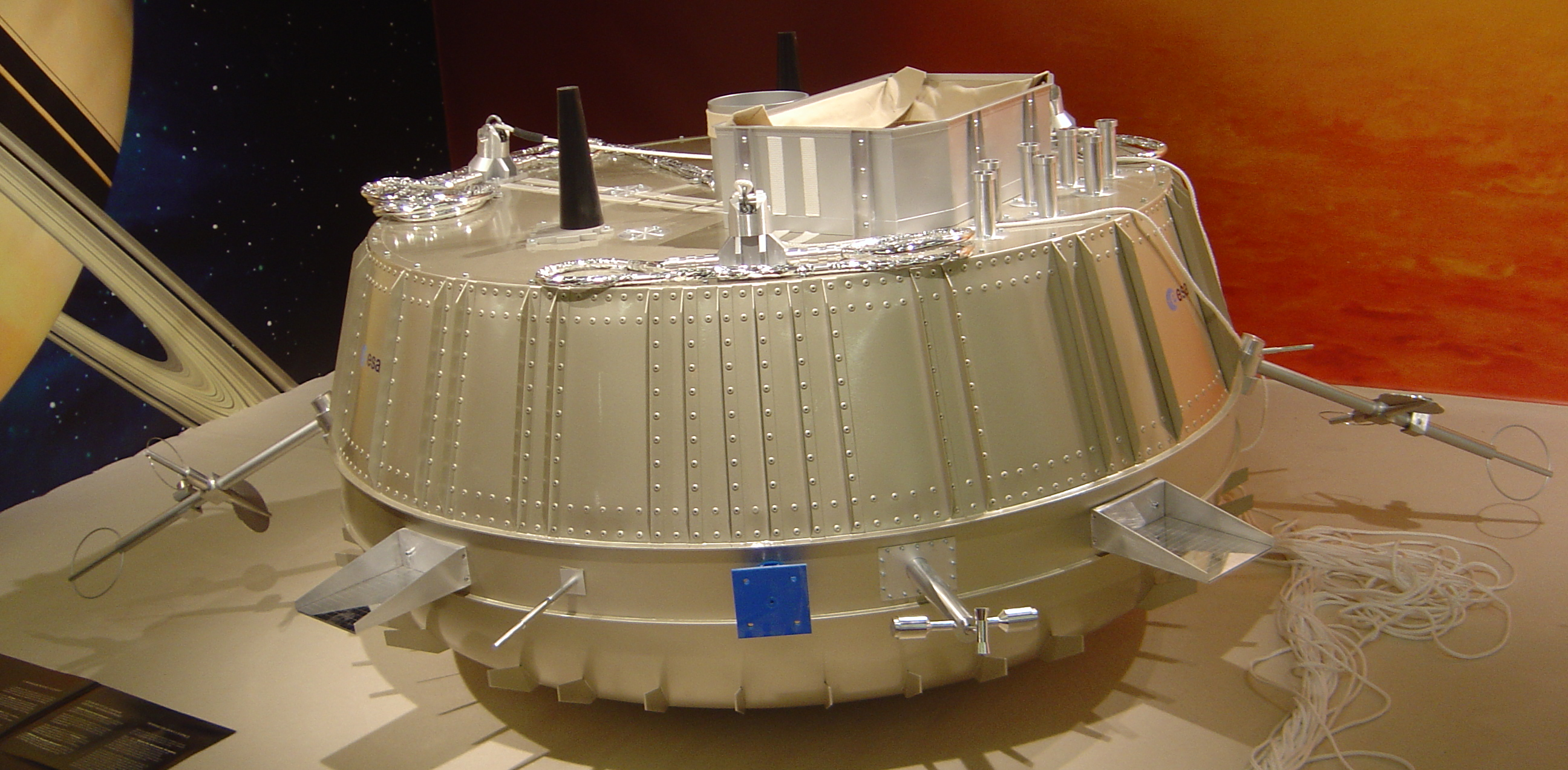
Scale model of the Huygens probe which landed on Titan

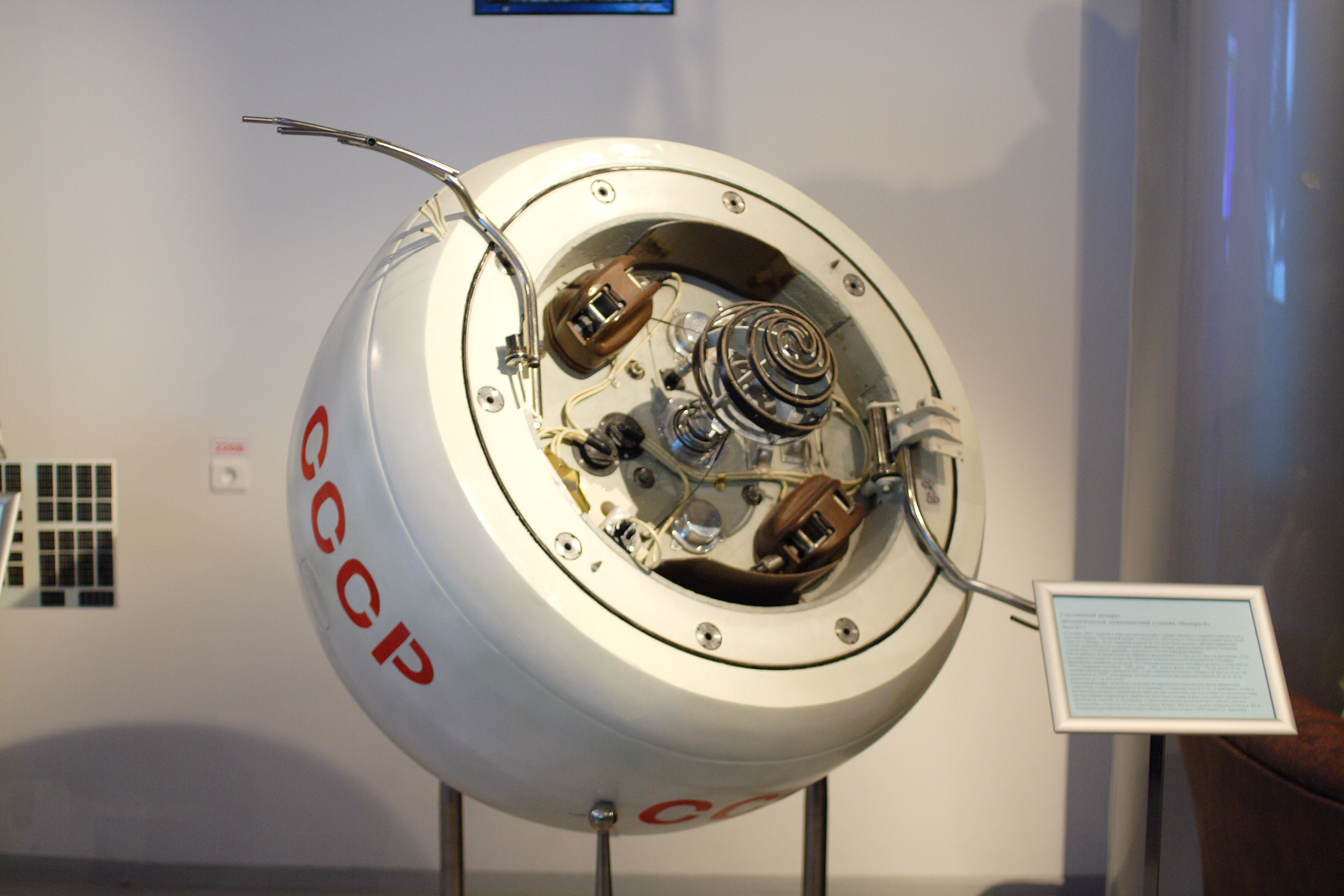
Venera 4

== See also ==
- Sample return mission and Moon rock
- List of archaeological sites beyond national boundaries
- List of landings on extraterrestrial bodies
- Deliberate crash landings on extraterrestrial bodies
- List of extraterrestrial orbiters
- List of artificial objects leaving the Solar System
