= List of spacecraft intentionally crashed into extraterrestrial bodies =

List of deliberate crash landings on extraterrestrial bodies

Deep Impact at Comet 9P/Tempel 1

DART at Dimorphos

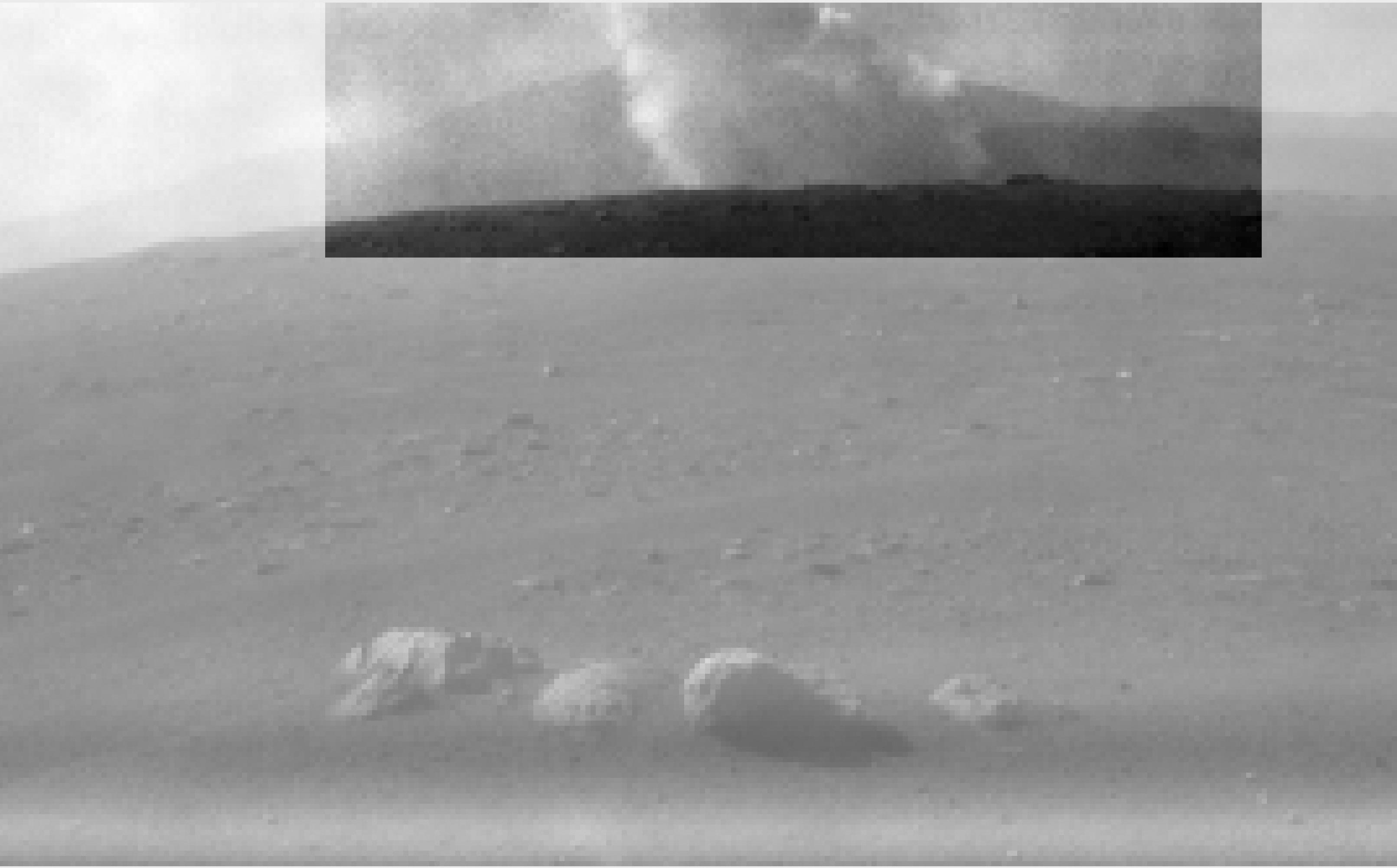
Mars 2020 Skycrane descent stage crash smoke plume in the distance

This is a list of uncrewed spacecraft which have been intentionally destroyed at their objects of study, typically by hard landings or crash landings at the end of their respective missions and/or functionality. This list only includes spacecraft specifically instructed to crash into the surface of an astronomical body other than the Earth, and also does not include unintentionally crashed spacecraft, derelict spacecraft, or spacecraft designed as landers. Intentionally crashing spacecraft not only removes the possibility of orbital space debris and planetary contamination, but also provides the opportunity (in some cases) for terminal science given that any transient light released by the kinetic energy may be available for spectroscopy; physical ejecta is also studied, and the impact crater(s) remain for further study.

Even after soft landings had (for the most part) been mastered, NASA used crash landings to test whether Moon craters contained ice by crashing space probes into craters and testing the debris that got thrown out. Several rocket stages utilized during the Apollo space program were intentionally crashed on the Moon to aid seismic research, and four of the ascent stages of Apollo Lunar Modules were intentionally crashed onto the Moon after they had fulfilled their primary mission. In total at least 47 NASA rocket bodies have impacted the Moon.

A recent impactor, the unusual double-crater of which was photographed on March 4, 2022, by the Lunar Reconnaissance Orbiter, is of unknown provenance; no space program has taken credit for it, although a later study attributed it to a spent upper stage from the Chang'e 5-T1 mission.

The Deep Impact mission had its own purpose-built impactor which hit Comet 9P/Tempel 1. Terminal approaches to gas giants which resulted in the destruction of the space probe count as crash landings for the purposes of this article. The crash landing sites themselves are of interest to space archeology.

Luna 1, not itself a lunar orbiter, was the first spacecraft designed as an impactor. It failed to hit the Moon in 1959, however, thus inadvertently becoming the first man-made object to leave geocentric orbit and enter a heliocentric orbit, where it remains.

== Planets ==
=== Mercury ===
Mission	Country/Agency	Date of landing/impact	Coordinates	Notes
MESSENGER	United States	30 April 2015	Probably around 54.4° N, 149.9° W, near the crater Janáček	Intentionally crashed at end of mission.

=== Venus ===
Mission	Country/Agency	Date of landing/impact	Coordinates	Notes
Venera 3	Soviet Union	1 March 1966	20°N 80°E	First manmade object to hit another planet. Failed to transmit data.
Venera 4	Soviet Union	18 October 1967	19°N 38°E	First probe to transmit data from another planet's atmosphere. Succumbed after 53 minutes, within 26 kilometres (16 mi) from the surface.
Venera 5	Soviet Union	16 May 1969	3°S 18°E	Succumbed after 51 minutes, within 26 kilometres (16 mi) from the surface.
Venera 6	Soviet Union	17 May 1969	5°S 23°E	Succumbed after 51 minutes, within 11 kilometres (6.8 mi) from the surface.
Venera 7	Soviet Union	15 December 1970	5°S 351°E	Unexpectedly survived impact and generated extremely weak signal after landing. (Note: Venera 8–14 and Vega 1 and 2 were explicitly designed to land on Venus and are not included in this list.)
Pioneer Venus Large probe	United States	9 December 1978	4.4°N 304.0°E	Stopped transmitting on impact with surface.
Pioneer Venus Small Probe North	United States	9 December 1978	59.3°N 4.8°E	Stopped transmitting on impact with surface.
Pioneer Venus Small Probe Day	United States	9 December 1978	31.3°S 317.0°E	Unexpectedly survived impact and transmitted for another 68 minutes.
Pioneer Venus Small Probe Night	United States	9 December 1978	28.7°S 56.7°E	Unexpectedly survived impact and transmitted for another 2 seconds.
Pioneer Venus Multiprobe Bus	United States	9 December 1978		Stopped transmitting within 110 kilometres (68 mi) from the surface.
Pioneer Venus Orbiter	United States	22 October 1992		Intentionally held to lower orbit to facilitate orbital decay.
Magellan	United States	13 October 1994		Controlled entry into Venus upon conclusion of mission.

=== Mars ===
Mission	Country/Agency	Date of landing/impact	Coordinates	Notes
Mars Science Laboratory Sky crane	United States	6 August 2012	Bradbury Landing; 4.5859°N 137.4312°E	Debris field created by the heat shield, sky crane, and other components.
Mars 2020 Sky crane	United States	18 February 2021	Octavia E. Butler Landing; 18.453°N 77.4504°E	Debris field created by the heat shield, sky crane, and other components.

=== Jupiter ===
Mission	Country/Agency	Date of landing/impact	Coordinates	Notes
Galileo atmospheric probe	United States	7 December 1995		Functioned for 57.6 minutes, disintegrated in the Jovian atmosphere
Galileo	United States	21 September 2003		Disintegrated in the Jovian atmosphere.

=== Saturn ===
Mission	Country/Agency	Date of landing/impact	Coordinates	Notes
Cassini orbiter	United States	15 September 2017	9.4° N, 53° W	30 seconds of terminal data, more than anticipated, were received prior to Cassini's disintegration in Saturn's atmosphere.

== Planetary moons ==
=== Earth's Moon ===
Mission	Country/Agency	Date of landing/impact	Coordinates	Notes
Luna 2	Soviet Union	13 September 1959	29.1°N -0°E	Intentional hard impact.
Ranger 4	United States	26 April 1962	15.5°S 130.7°W	Intentional hard impact; hit lunar far side due to failure of navigation system.
Ranger 6	United States	2 February 1964	9.4°N 21.5°E	Intentional hard impact.
Ranger 7	United States	31 July 1964	10.35°S 20.58°W	Intentional hard impact.
Ranger 8	United States	20 February 1965	2.72°N 24.61°E	Intentional hard impact.
Ranger 9	United States	24 March 1965	12.83°S 2.37°W	Intentional hard impact.
Lunar Orbiter 1	United States	29 October 1966	6.35°N 160.72°E	Lunar orbiter, intentionally crashed at end of mission.
Hiten	Japan	10 April 1993	34.3°S 55.6°E	Lunar orbiter, intentionally crashed at end of mission.
Lunar Prospector	United States	31 July 1999	87.7°S 42.1°E	Lunar orbiter, intentionally crashed into polar crater at end of mission to test for liberation of water vapour (not detected).
SMART-1	European Space Agency	3 September 2006	34.262°S 46.193°W	Lunar orbiter, intentionally crashed at end of mission.
Chandrayaan-1 Moon Impact Probe	India	14 November 2008	89.76°S 39.40°W	Impactor. Water found.
SELENE Rstar (Okina)	Japan	12 February 2009		Lunar orbiter, intentionally crashed at end of mission.
Chang'e 1	China	1 March 2009	1.50°S 52.36°E	Lunar orbiter, intentionally crashed at end of mission.
Kaguya	Japan	10 June 2009		Lunar orbiter, intentionally crashed at end of mission.
LCROSS (Centaur)	United States	9 October 2009	84.675°S 48.725°W; 84.729°S 49.360°W	Impactors: main craft flew through the plume of lunar dust created by its own upper rocket stage gathering data. Water confirmed.
Longjiang 2	China	31 July 2019	16.6956°N 159.5170°E	Micro-satellite, intentionally crashed at end of mission.
Chang'e 5 ascender	China	7 December 2020	30°S 0°E	Intentional impact of ascent stage after delivering sample to orbiter.
Chang'e 6 ascender	China	6 June 2024		Intentional impact of ascent stage after delivering sample to orbiter.

== Other bodies ==
=== Asteroids ===
Mission	Country/Agency	Date of landing/impact	Coordinates	Notes
NEAR Shoemaker	United States	12 February 2001	Eros	Slow impact with asteroid surface, spacecraft operated for another two weeks on asteroid surface.
Hayabusa 2 Small Carry-On Impactor (SCI)	Japan	5 April 2019	Ryugu	Copper projectile shot at surface with explosive charge to expose asteroid subsurface.
Double Asteroid Redirection Test (DART)	United States	26 September 2022	Dimorphos	First attempt in history to redirect an asteroid.

=== Comets ===
Mission	Country/Agency	Date of landing/impact	Coordinates	Notes
Deep Impact	United States	4 July 2005	Tempel 1	The "Smart Impactor" had a payload of 100 kg of copper, which at its closing velocity of 10.2 km/s had the kinetic energy equivalent to 4.8 tonnes of TNT.
Rosetta	European Space Agency	30 September 2016	67P/Churyumov–Gerasimenko	Intentionally crashed at end of mission.

== Chronological gallery ==
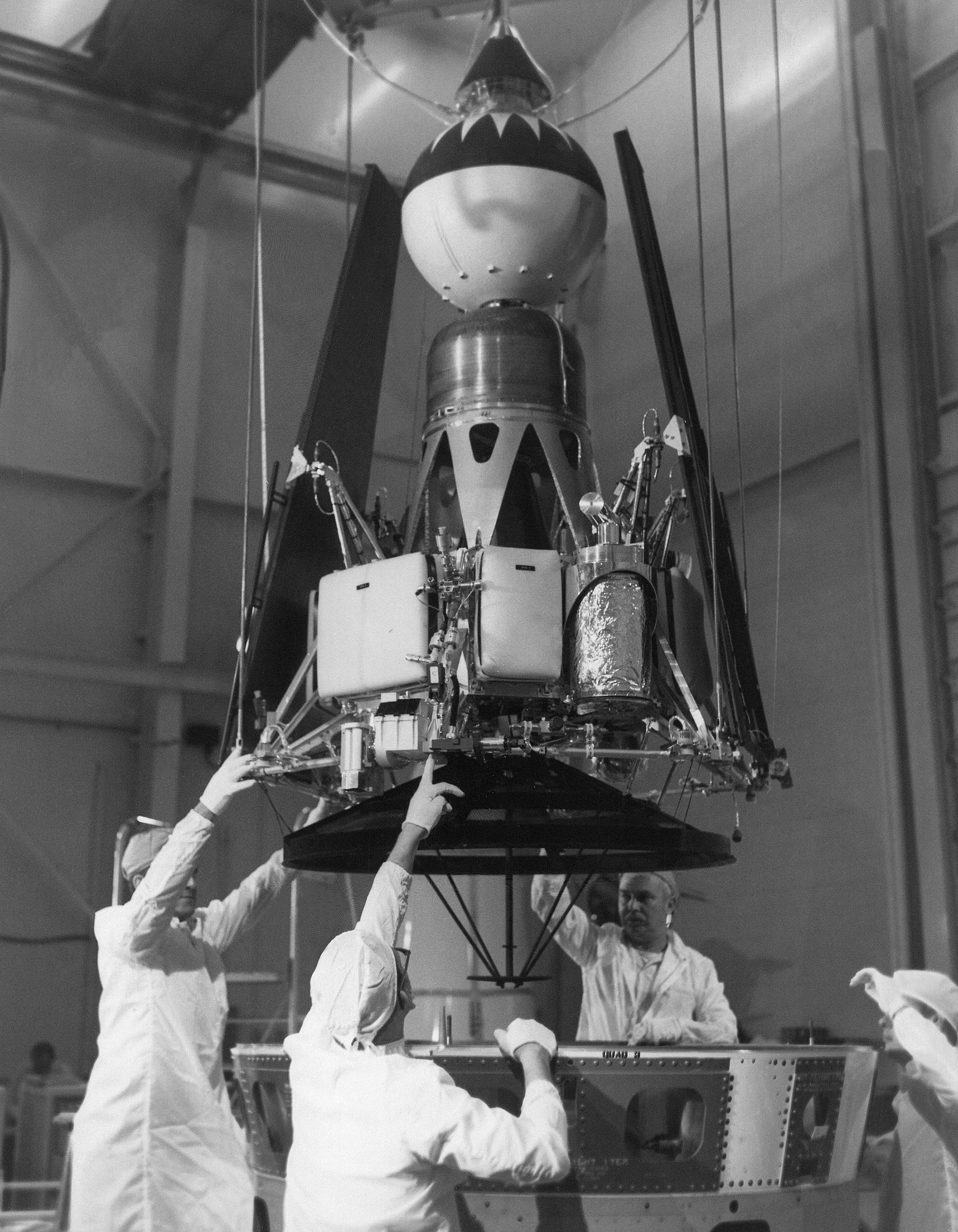
Ranger 4

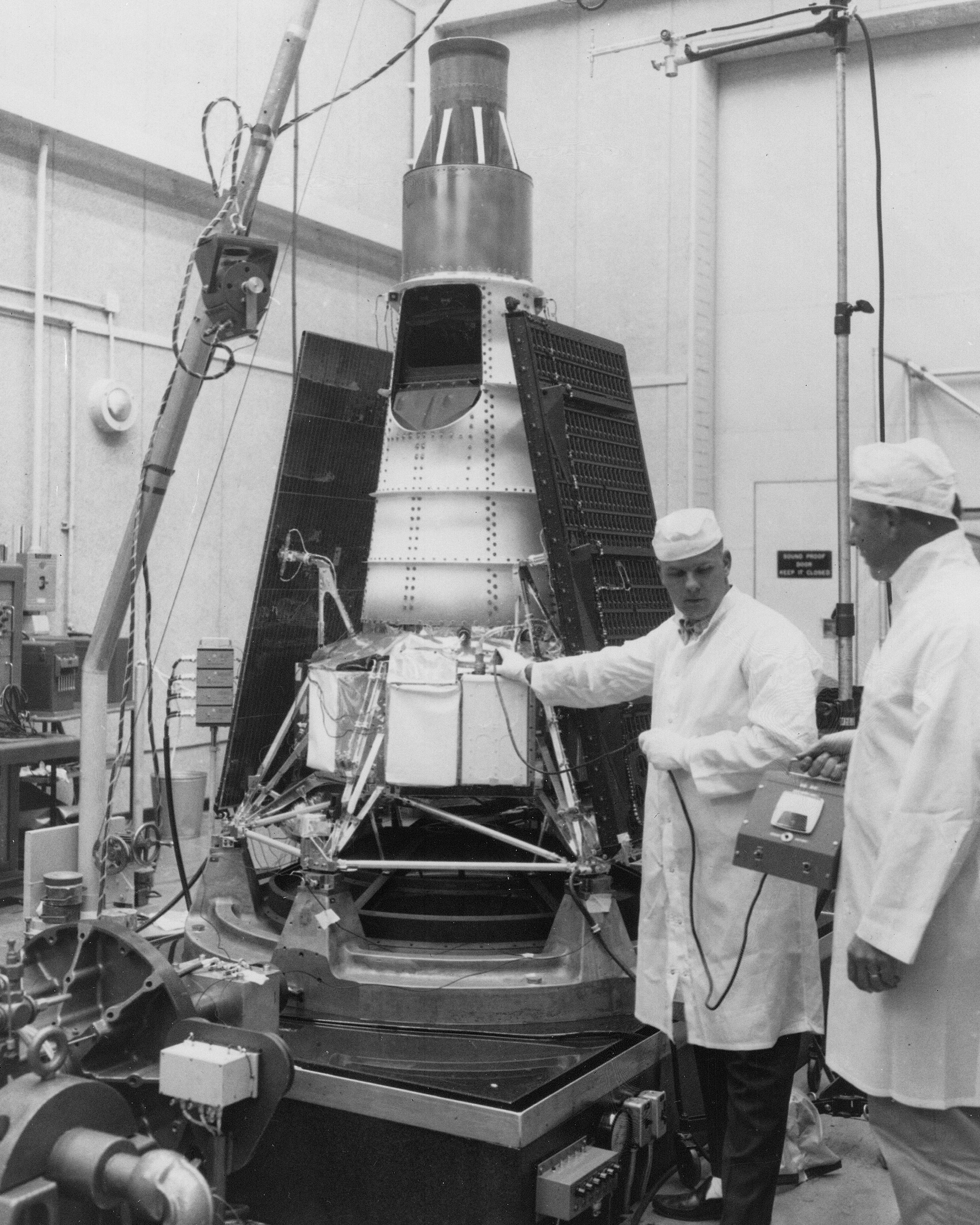
Ranger 6

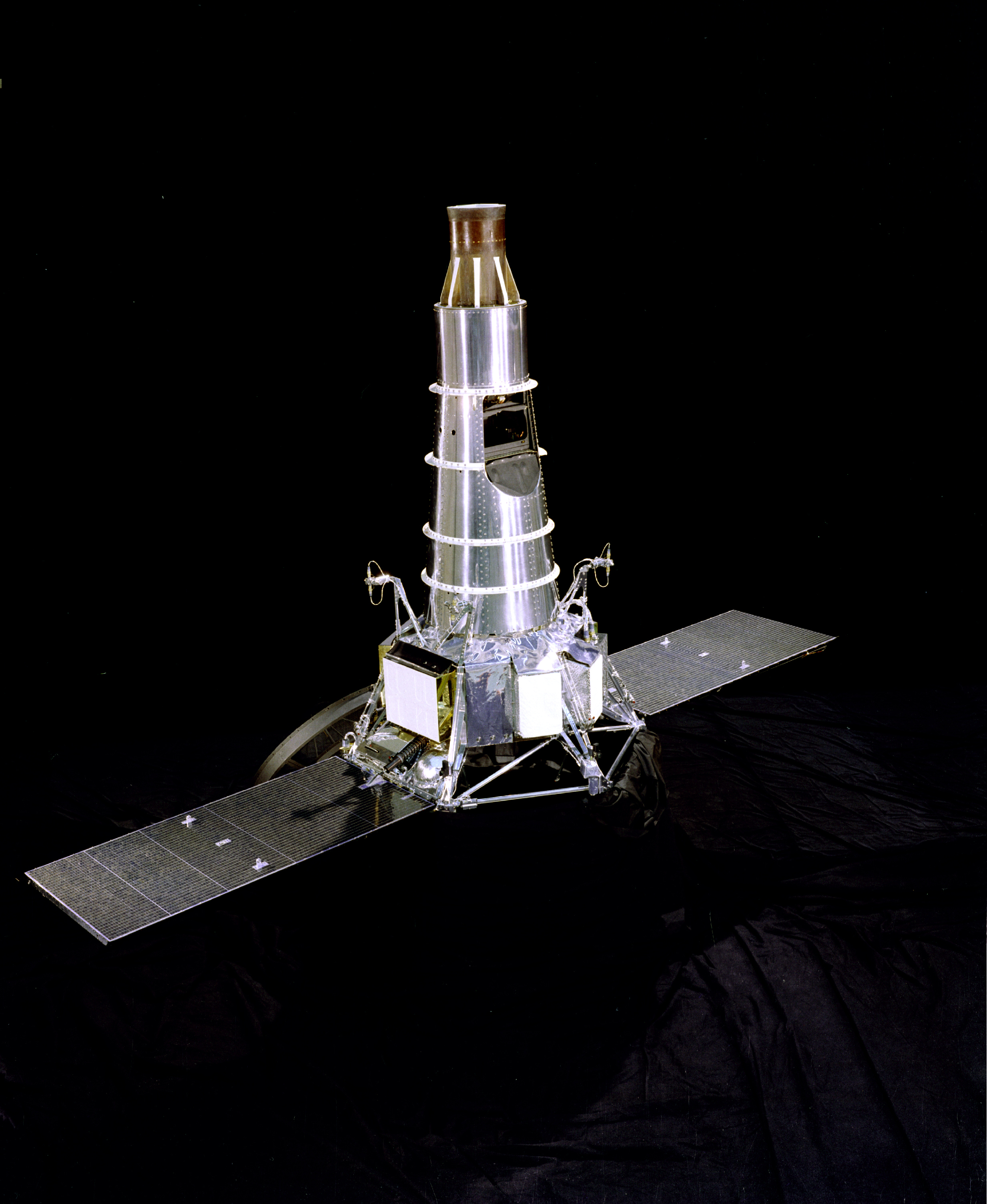
Rangers 7, 8, and 9

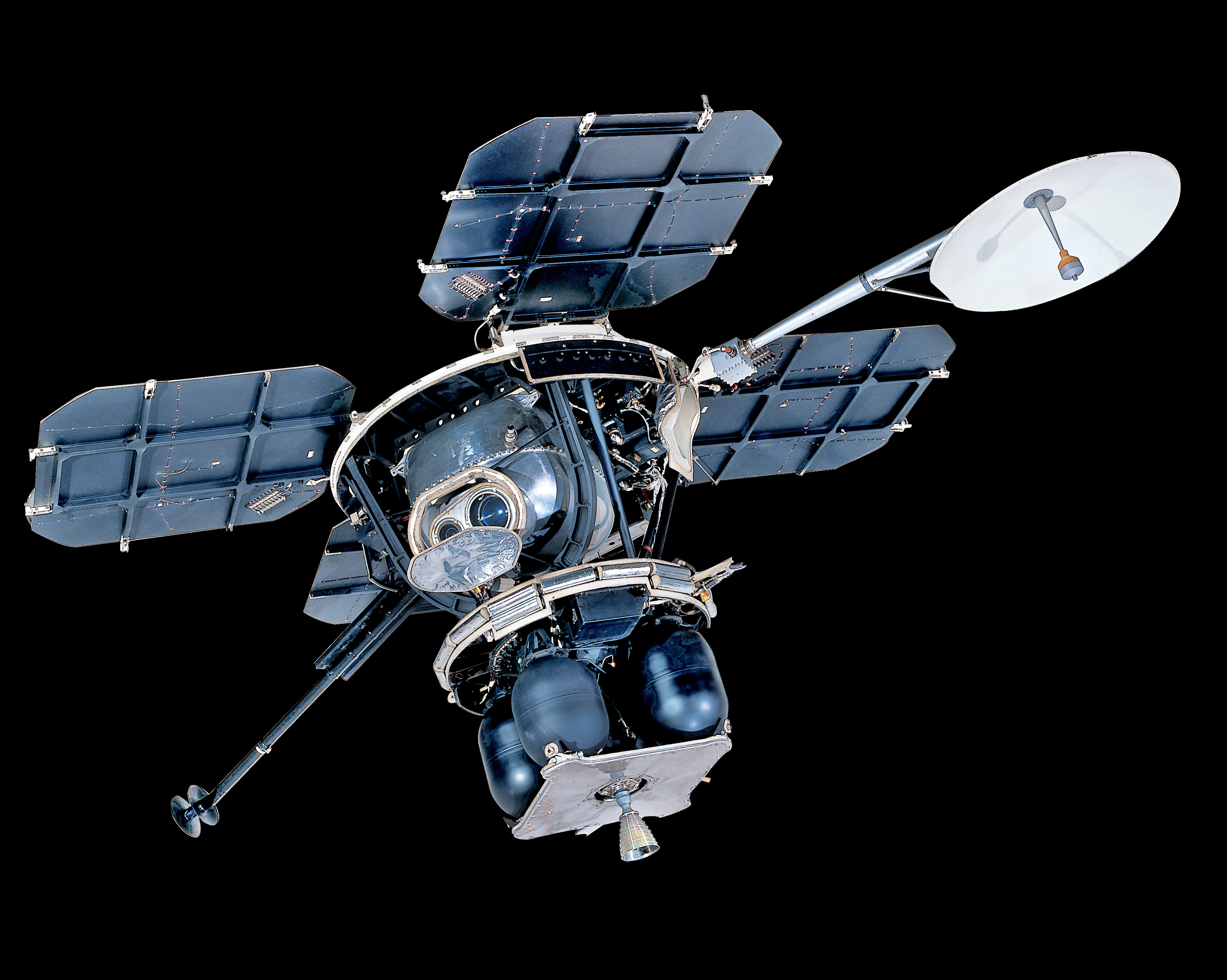
Lunar Orbiter 1

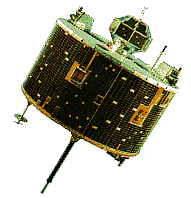
Hiten

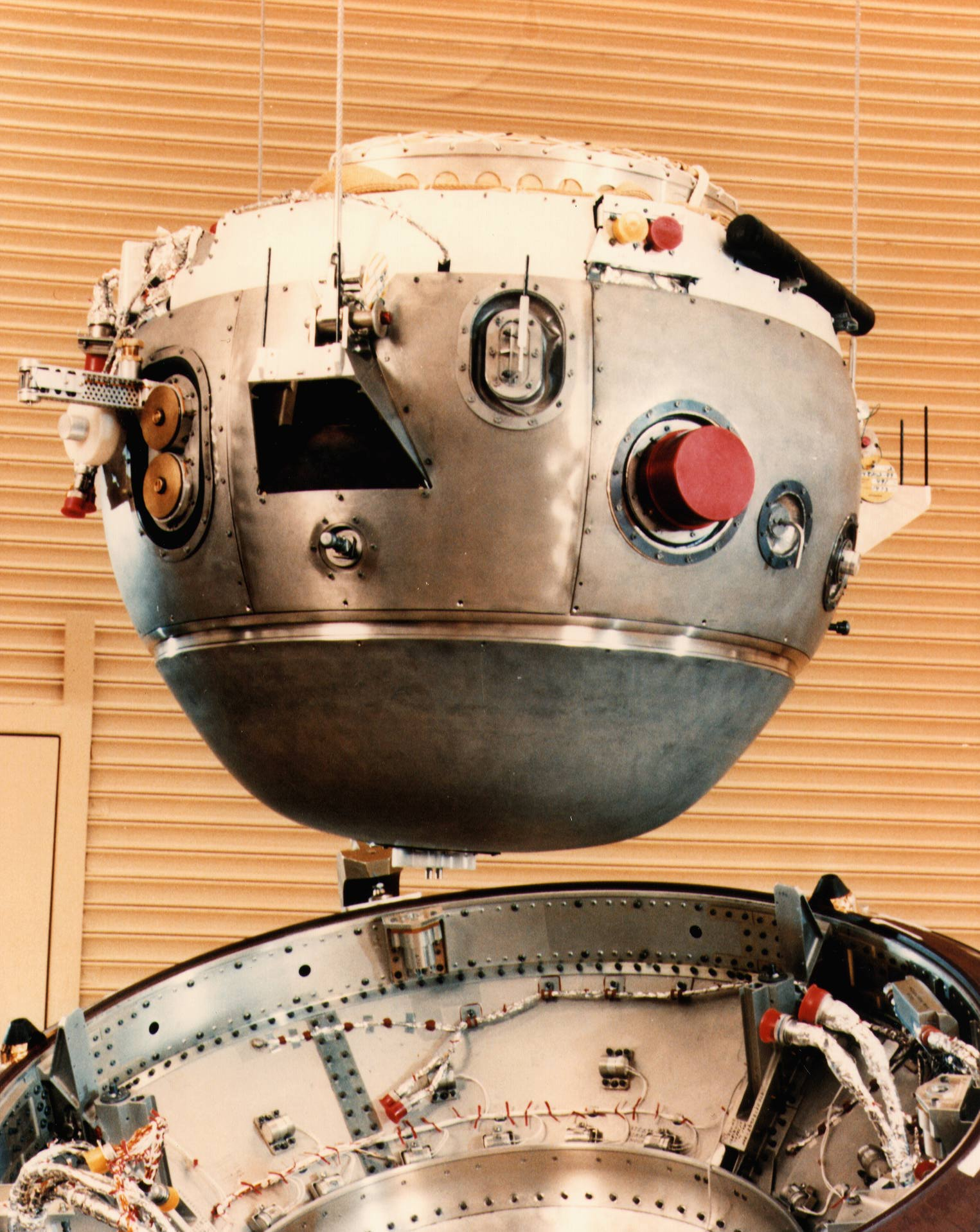
Galileo Probe

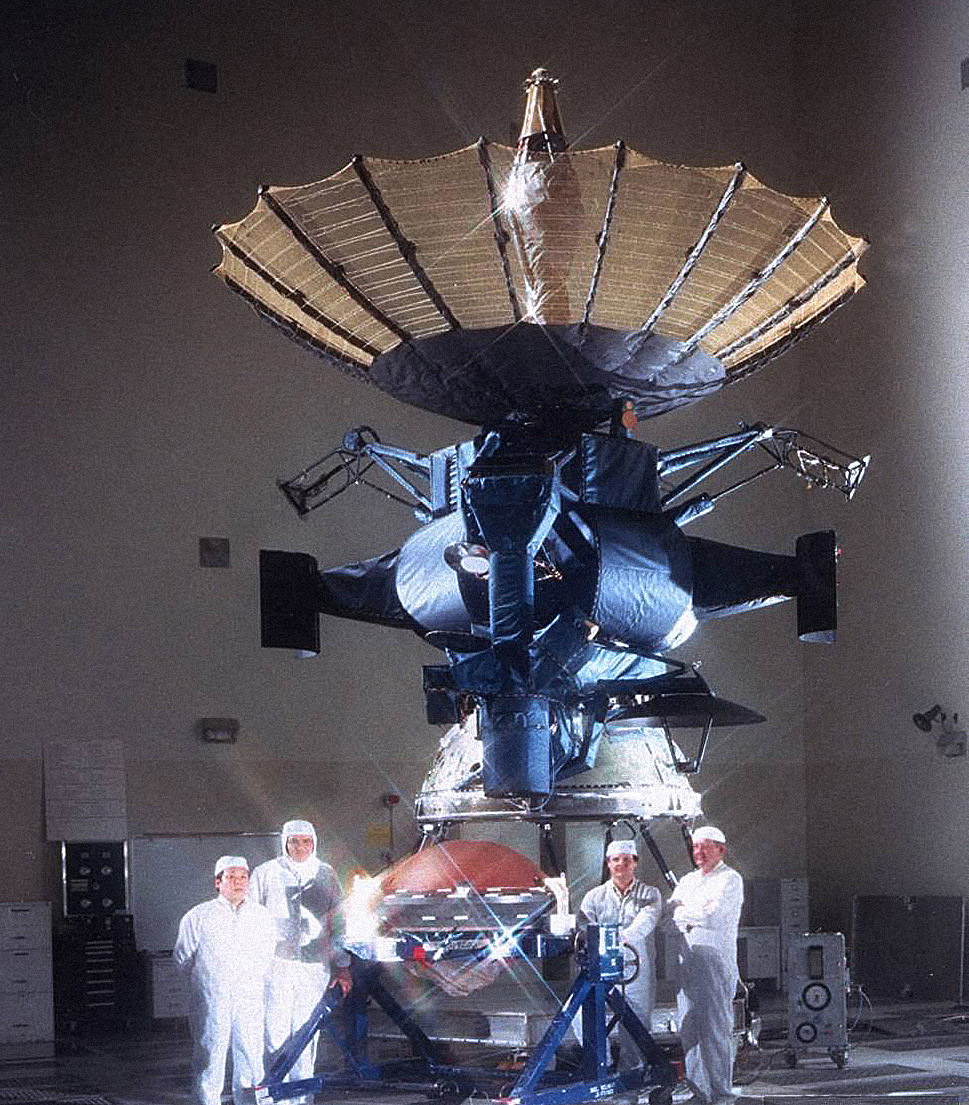
Galileo

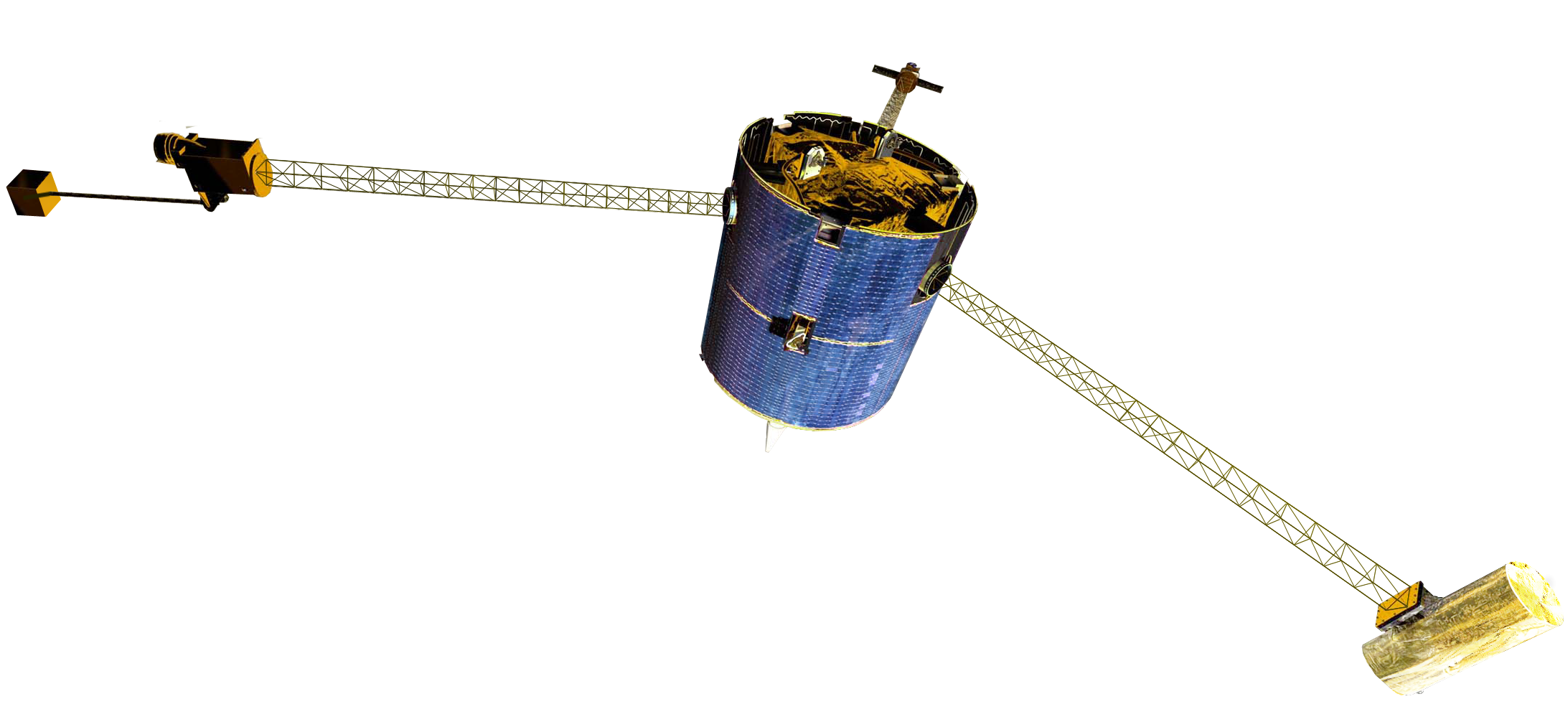
Lunar Prospector

Deep Impact

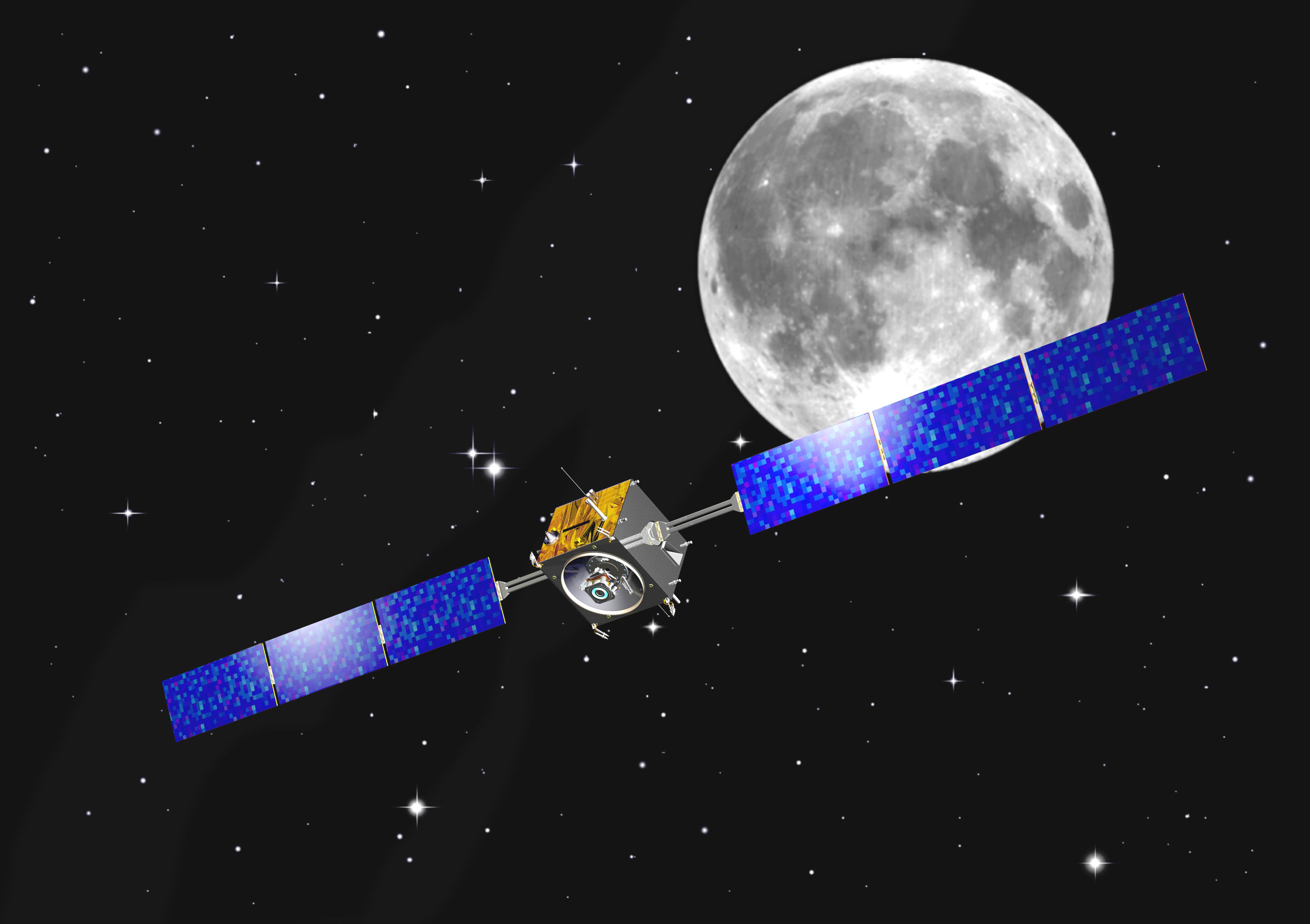
SMART-1

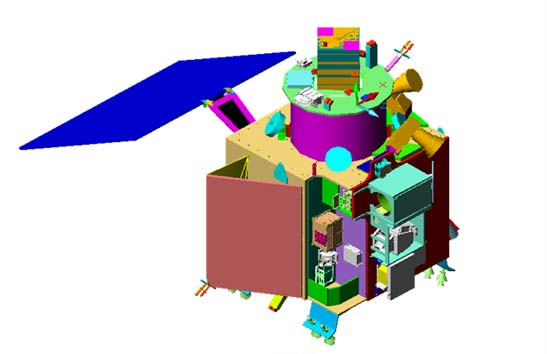
Chandrayaan-1

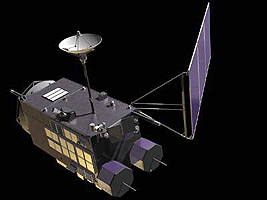
SELENE (Kaguya)/Okina

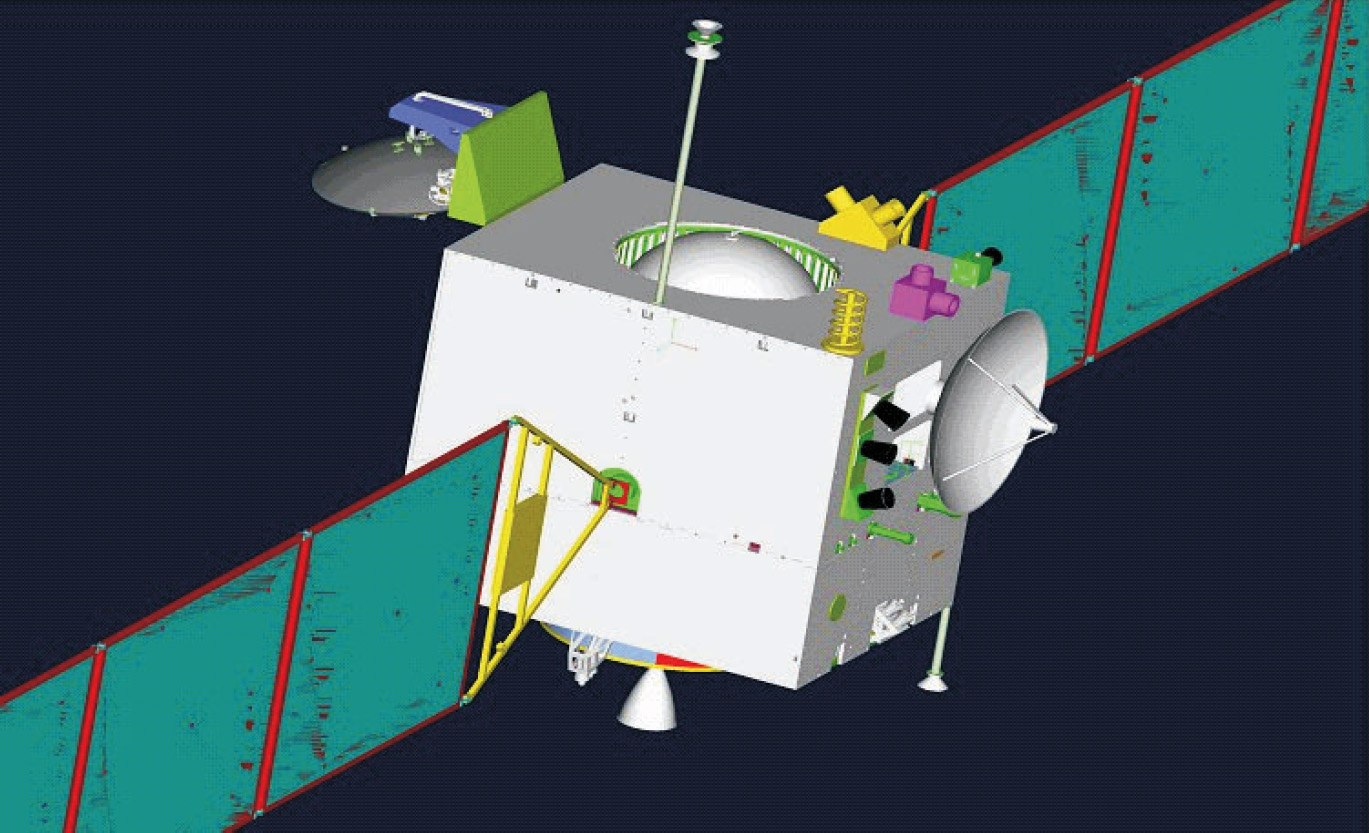
Chang'e 1

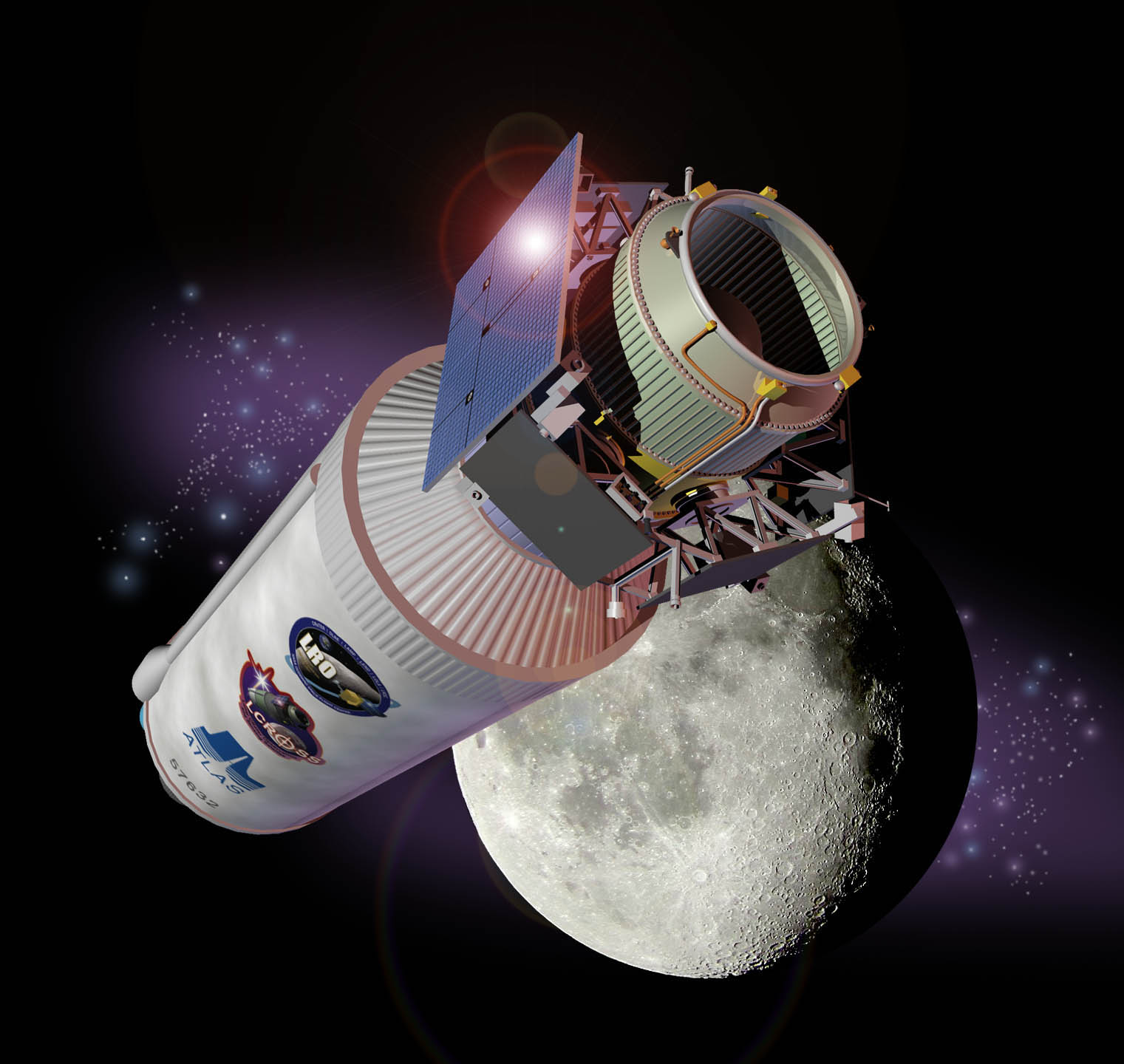
LCROSS

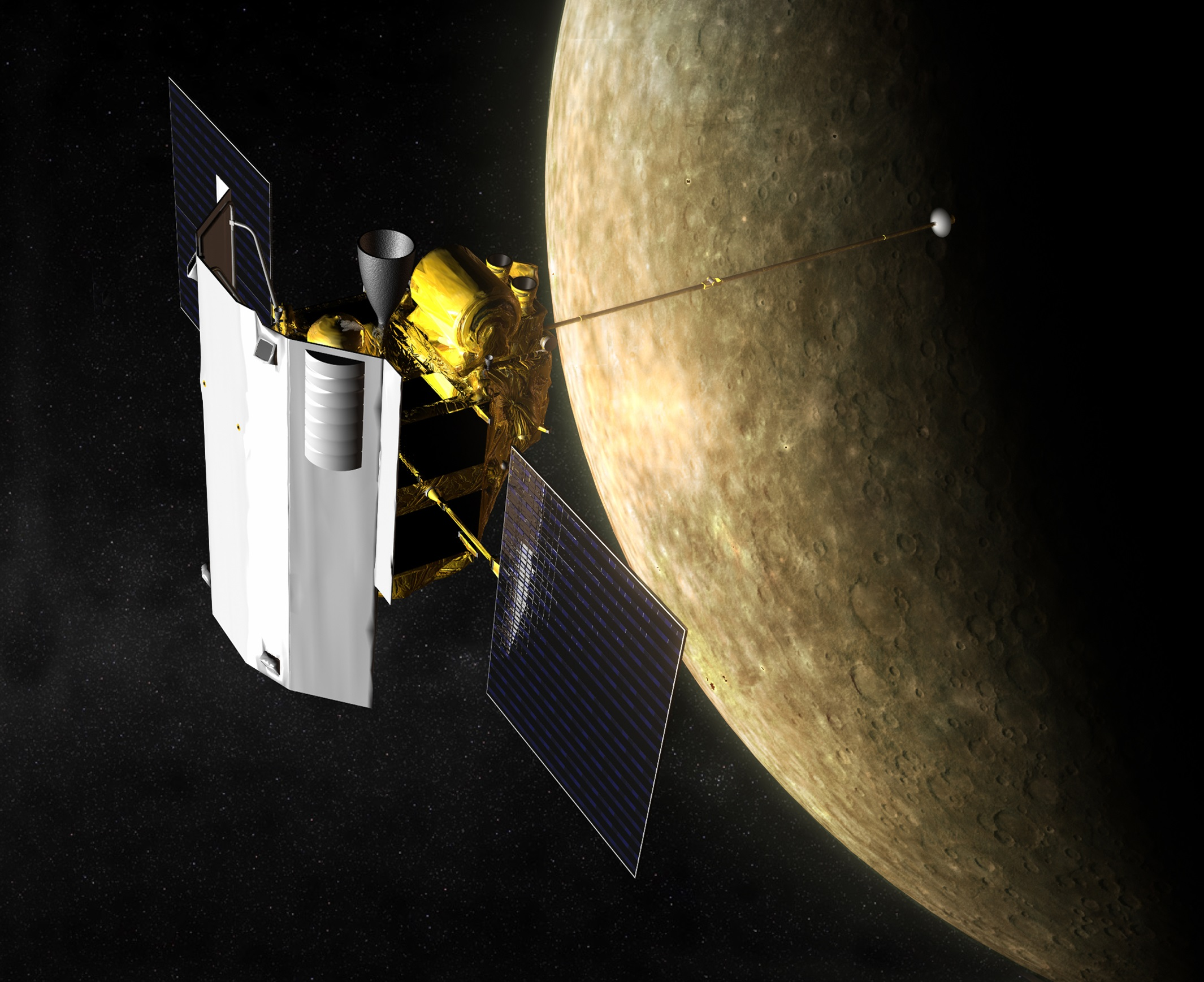
MESSENGER

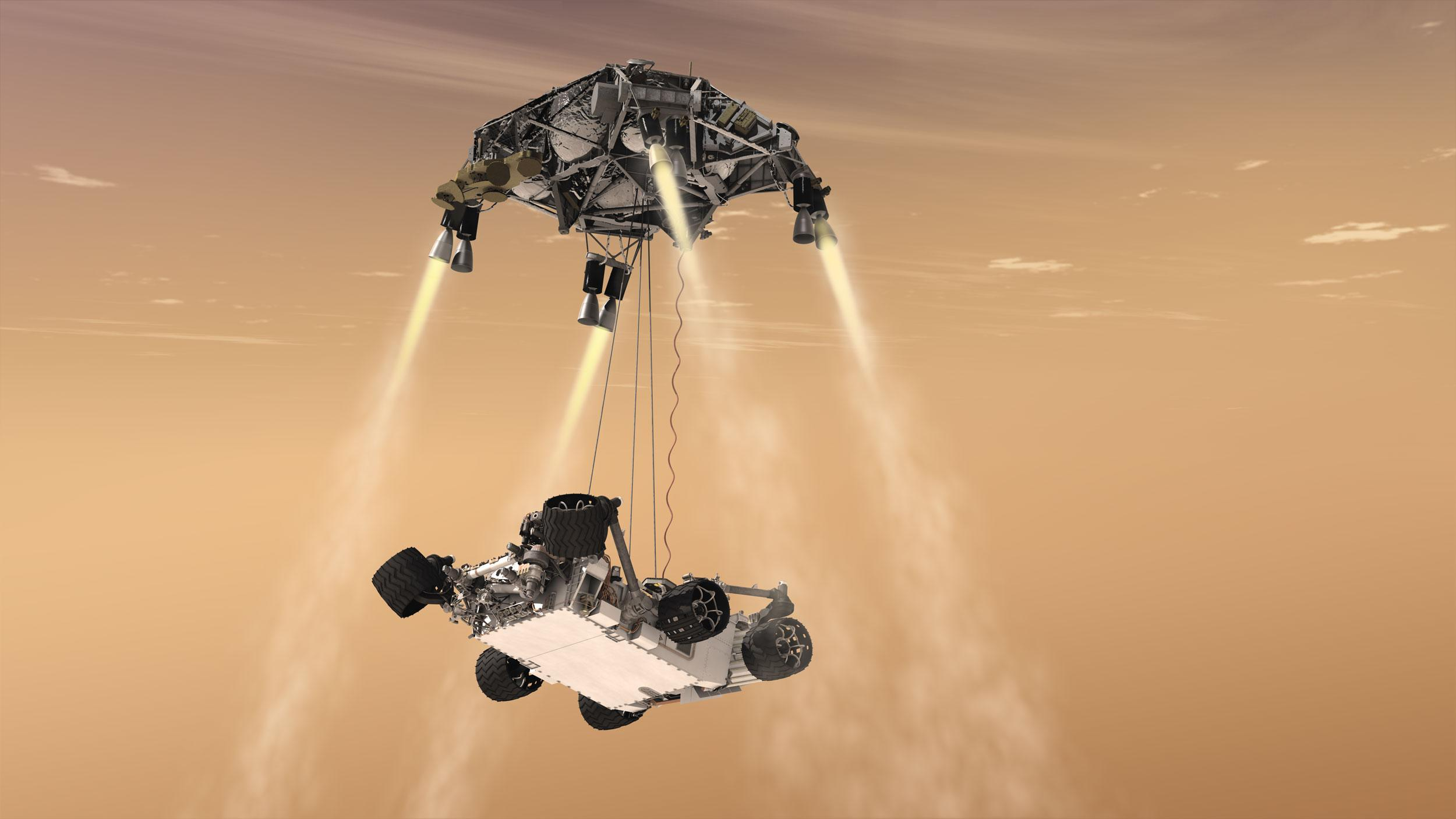
Mars Science Laboratory

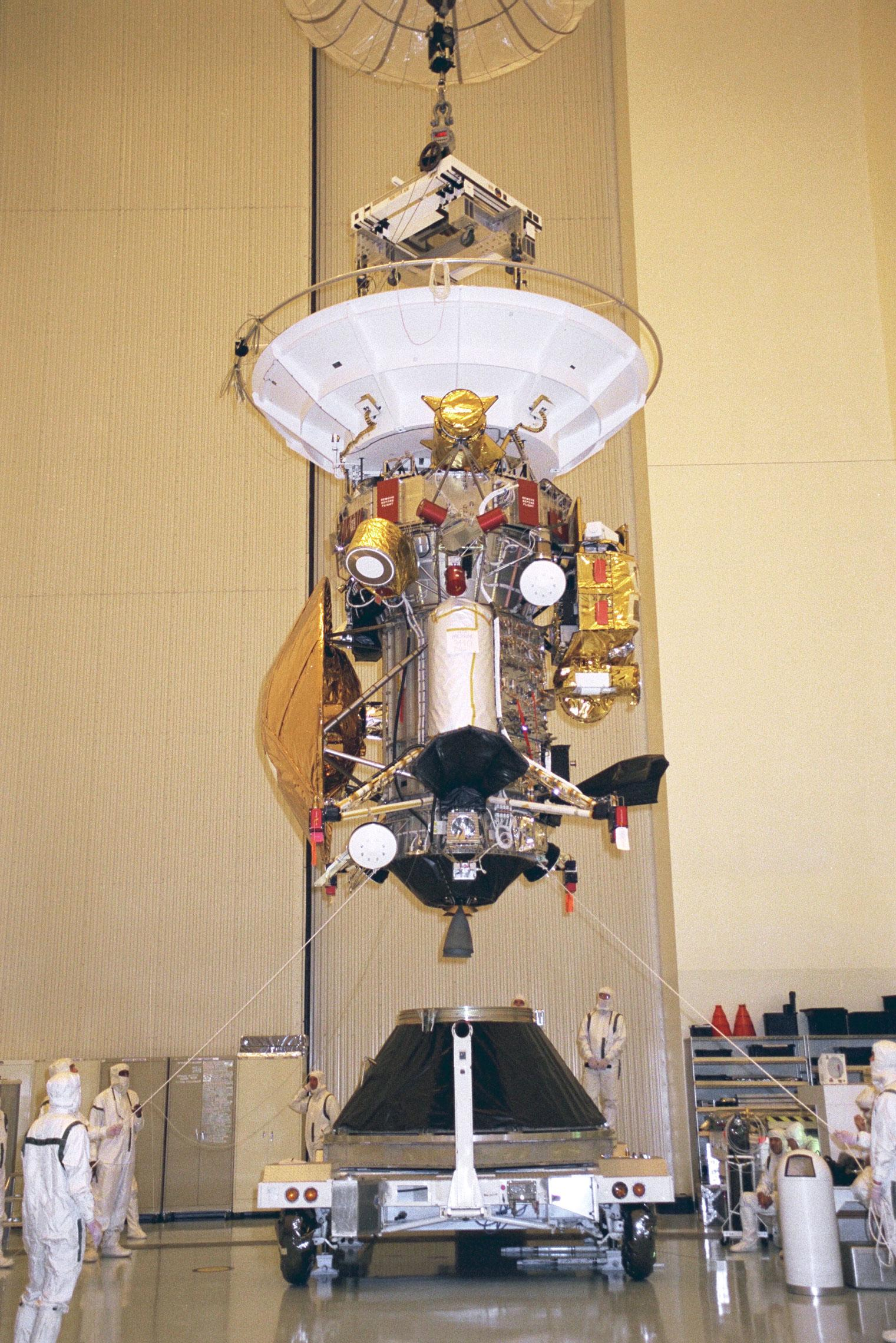
Cassini

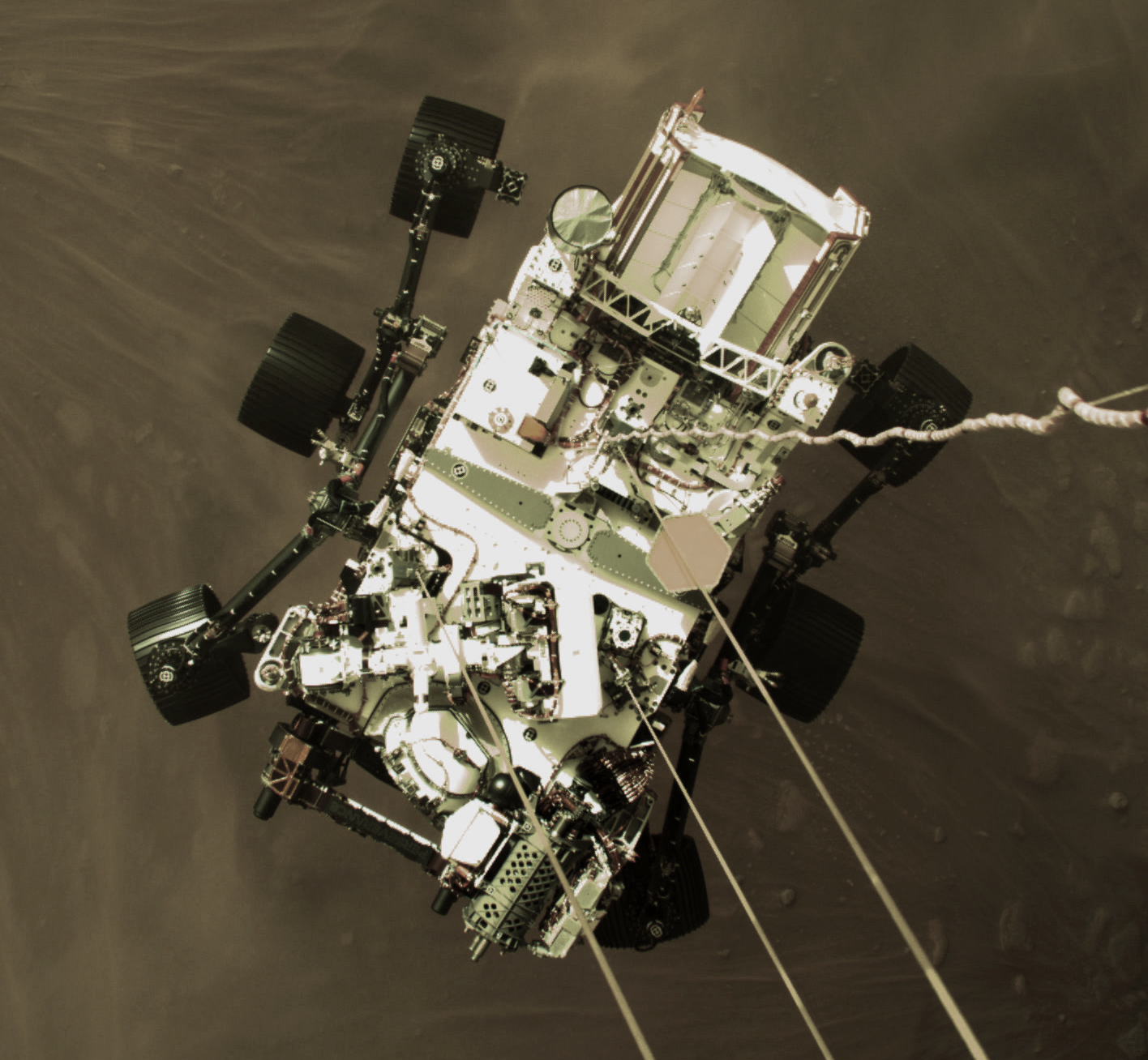
Mars 2020

== See also ==
- List of extraterrestrial orbiters
- List of landings on extraterrestrial bodies
- List of artificial objects on extraterrestrial surfaces
- Flyby (spaceflight)
- Space rendezvous
