= Planetary mnemonic =

Phrase used to remember the planets of the Solar System

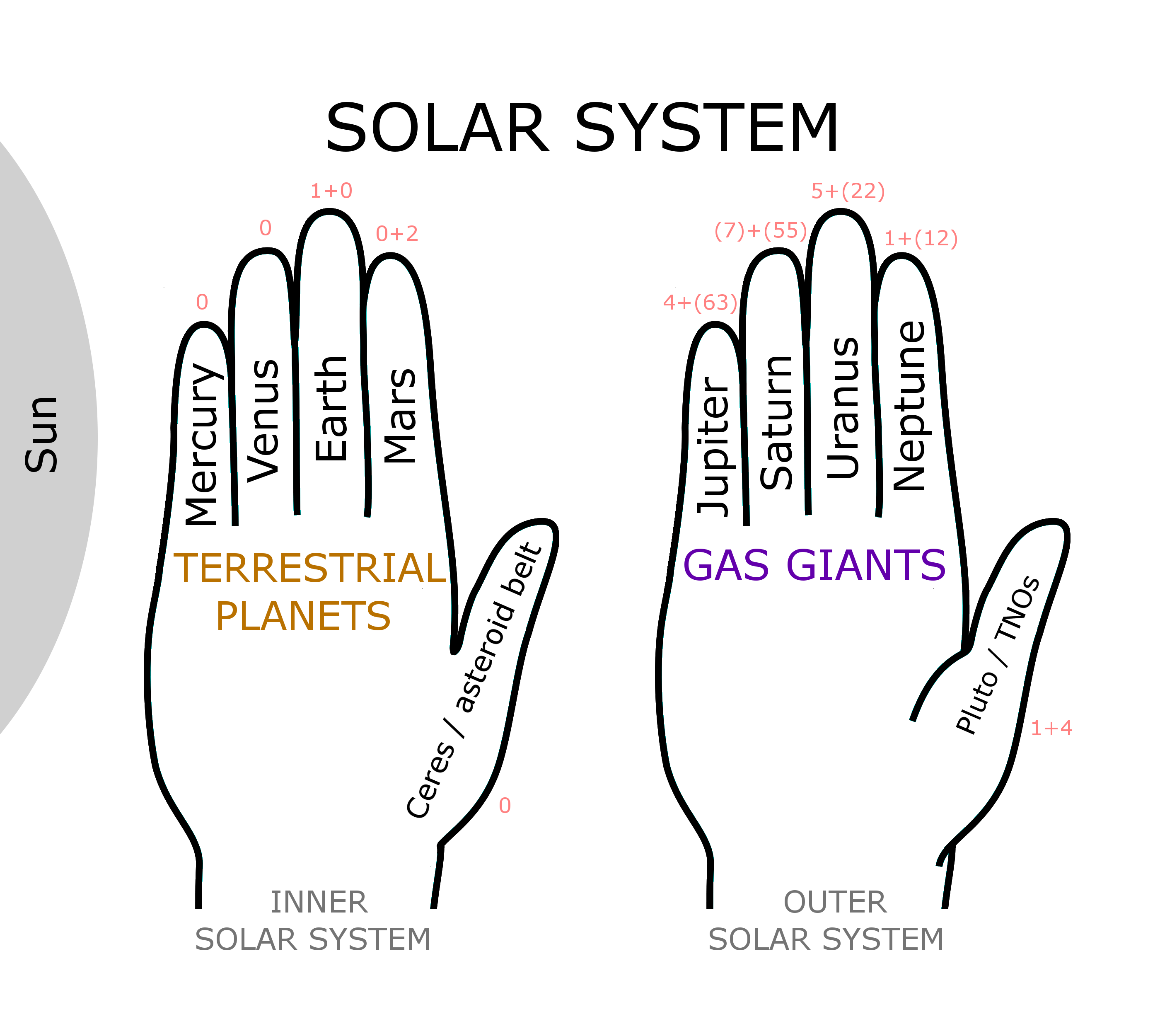
A representation of the above method with the left hand representing the terrestrial planets and the right hand, with palm turned upward, is representing the giant planets along with TNOs

A planetary mnemonic refers to a phrase created to remember the planets and belts of smaller bodies of the Solar System, with the order of words corresponding to increasing sidereal periods of the bodies. One simple visual mnemonic is to hold out both hands side-by-side with thumbs in the same direction (typically left-hand facing palm down, and right-hand palm up). The fingers of hand with palm down represent the terrestrial planets where the left pinkie represents Mercury and its thumb represents the asteroid belt, including Ceres. The other hand represents the giant planets, with its thumb representing trans-Neptunian objects, including Pluto.

== Nine planets ==
Before 2006, Mercury, Venus, Earth, Mars, Jupiter, Saturn, Uranus, Neptune, and Pluto were considered planets. Below is a partial list of these mnemonics:

- "Men Very Easily Make Jugs Serve Useful Needs, Perhaps" – The structure of this sentence, which is current in the 1950s, suggests that it may have originated before Pluto's discovery. It can easily be trimmed back to reflect Pluto's categorical change to dwarf planet. It's also the best-known mnemonic where the first two letters of 'Men' and 'Make' help to differentiate Mercury from Mars.
- "My Very Elegant Mother Just Sat Upon Nine Porcupines"
- "Mary's violet eyes make Johnnie stay up nights pondering"
- "My Very Educated Mother Just Served Us Nine Pizzas"

With the IAU's 2006 definition of planet which reclassified Pluto as a dwarf planet, along with Ceres and Eris, these mnemonics became obsolete.

== Eight planets ==
When Pluto's significance was changed to dwarf planet, mnemonics could no longer include the final "P". The first notable suggestion came from Kyle Sullivan of Lumberton, Mississippi, USA, whose mnemonic was published in the Jan. 2007 issue of Astronomy magazine: "My Violent Evil Monster Just Scared Us Nuts". In August 2006, for the eight planets recognized under the new definition, Phyllis Lugger, professor of astronomy at Indiana University suggested the following modification to the common mnemonic for the nine planets: "My Very Educated Mother Just Served Us Nachos". She proposed this mnemonic to Owen Gingerich, Chair of the International Astronomical Union (IAU) Planet Definition Committee and published the mnemonic in the American Astronomical Society Committee on the Status of Women in Astronomy Bulletin Board on August 25, 2006. It also appeared in Indiana University's IU News Room Star Trak on August 30, 2006. This mnemonic is used by the IAU on their website for the public.

Others angry at the IAU's decision to "demote" Pluto composed sarcastic mnemonics in protest:

- "Many Very Educated Men Justify Stealing Unique Ninth" – found in Schott's Miscellany by Ben Schott.
- "Many Very Educated Men Just Screwed Up Nature" – this mnemonic is mentioned by Mike Brown, who discovered Eris.
- "Most Very Elderly Men Just Slept Under Newspapers".

Slightly risque versions include,

- "Mary's 'Virgin' Explanation Made Joseph Suspect Upstairs Neighbor".

== Eleven planets and dwarf planets ==
In 2007, the National Geographic Society sponsored a contest for a new mnemonic of MVEMCJSUNPE, incorporating the then-eleven known planets and dwarf planets, including Eris, Ceres, and the newly demoted Pluto. On February 22, 2008,

- "My Very Exciting Magic Carpet Just Sailed Under Nine Palace Elephants",

coined by 10-year-old Maryn Smith of Great Falls, Montana, was announced as the winner. The phrase was featured in the song 11 Planets by Grammy-nominated singer and songwriter Lisa Loeb and in the book 11 Planets: A New View of the Solar System by David Aguilar (ISBN 978-1426302367).

== Thirteen planets and dwarf planets ==
Since the National Geographic competition, two additional bodies were designated as dwarf planets, Makemake and Haumea, on July 11 and September 17, 2008 respectively. A 2015 New York Times article suggested some mnemonics including,

- "My Very Educated Mother Cannot Just Serve Us Nine Pizzas—Hundreds May Eat!"

== Longer lists ==
Longer mnemonics may be required in the future, if more candidate dwarf planets turn out to be dwarfs. As of 2026, 9 objects are generally believed to be dwarfs: Ceres in the asteroid belt and 8 beyond Neptune (in order: Orcus, Pluto, Haumea, Quaoar, Makemake, Gonggong, Eris, Sedna). This would make a list 17 objects long, though smaller objects such as Orcus and Sedna are still rather uncertain.

It is unlikely that additional known bodies are dwarfs, and the next largest bodies (Salacia and Máni) would cause duplicates among the letters for the dwarfs.

== See also ==
- Lists of astronomical objects
