= List of landings on extraterrestrial bodies =

This is a list of all spacecraft landings on other planets and bodies in the Solar System, including soft landings and both intended and unintended hard impacts. The list includes orbiters that were intentionally crashed, but not orbiters which later crashed in an unplanned manner due to orbital decay.

Colour key:

– Unsuccessful soft landing, intentional hard landing, or mission still in progress.
– Successful soft landing with intelligible data return. The tannish hue indicates extraterrestrial soil.
– Successful soft landing, intelligible data return, and sample return to Earth. The greenish hue indicates terrestrial return.
– Successful soft landing, data/voice/video communication, sample return to Earth, and safe astronaut landing and return to Earth.

== Planets ==
=== Mercury ===
Mission	Country/Agency	Date of landing/impact	Coordinates	Notes
MESSENGER	United States	30 April 2015	Probably around 54.4° N, 149.9° W, near the crater Janáček	Intentionally crashed at end of mission.

=== Venus ===
Mission	Country/Agency	Date of landing/impact	Coordinates	Notes
Venera 3	(Soviet Union) USSR	1 March 1966	Probably around -20° to 20° N, 60° to 80° E	First impact on the surface of another planet. Contact lost before atmospheric entry.
Venera 4	(Soviet Union) USSR	23 October 1967	Estimated near 19°N 38°E.	Crushed by atmospheric pressure before impact.
Venera 5	(Soviet Union) USSR	16 May 1969	3°S 18°E	Atmospheric probe; crushed by atmospheric pressure before impact.
Venera 6	(Soviet Union) USSR	17 May 1969	5°S 23°E	Atmospheric probe; crushed by atmospheric pressure before impact.
Venera 7	(Soviet Union) USSR	15 December 1970	5°S 351°E	First successful soft landing on another planet; transmitted from surface for 23 minutes. The spacecraft definitively confirmed that humans cannot survive on the surface of Venus, and excluded the possibility of any liquid water on Venus.
Venera 8	(Soviet Union) USSR	22 July 1972	Within 150 km radius of 10.70°S 335.25°E	Soft landing; transmitted from surface for 50 minutes.
Venera 9 lander	(Soviet Union) USSR	22 October 1975	Within a 150 km radius of 31.01°N 291.64°E	Soft landing; transmitted from surface for 53 minutes. First pictures from surface.
Venera 10 lander	(Soviet Union) USSR	25 October 1975	Within a 150 km radius of 15.42°N 291.51°E	Soft landing; transmitted from surface for 65 minutes.
Pioneer Venus Multiprobe	(United States) USA	9 December 1978	Day Probe 31.3°S 317.0°E	Survived impact and continued to transmit from the surface for 67 minutes.
Pioneer Venus Multiprobe	(United States) USA	9 December 1978	Night Probe 28.7°S 56.7°E	Survived impact and continued to transmit from the surface for 2 seconds.
Pioneer Venus Multiprobe	(United States) USA	9 December 1978	North Probe 59.3°N 4.8°E	Signal lost upon impact.
Pioneer Venus Multiprobe	(United States) USA	9 December 1978	Large probe 4.4°N 304.0°E	Signal lost upon impact.
Venera 12 lander	(Soviet Union) USSR	21 December 1978	7°S 294°E	Soft landing; transmitted from surface for 110 minutes.
Venera 11 lander	(Soviet Union) USSR	25 December 1978	14°S 299°E	Soft landing; transmitted from surface for 95 minutes.
Venera 13 lander	(Soviet Union) USSR	1 March 1982	7.5°S 303°E	Soft landing; transmitted from surface for 127 minutes. First photographs in color of its surface, and it records atmospheric wind noises, the first sounds heard from another planet.
Venera 14 lander	(Soviet Union) USSR	5 March 1982	13.25°S 310°E	Soft landing; transmitted from surface for 57 minutes.
Vega 1 lander	(Soviet Union) USSR	11 June 1985	7.2°N 177.8°E	Soft landing; some instruments failed to return data.
Vega 2 lander	(Soviet Union) USSR	15 June 1985	7.14°S 177.67°E	Soft landing; transmitted from surface for 57 minutes.

=== Mars ===
Mission	Country/Agency	Date of landing/impact	Coordinates	Notes
Mars 2 lander	(Soviet Union) USSR	27 November 1971	45°S 30°W	First man-made object on Mars. No contact after crash landing.
Mars 3 lander	(Soviet Union) USSR	2 December 1971	45°S 158°W	First soft landing on Mars. Transmission began about 90 seconds after landing. Transmitted a partial image for 14.5 seconds before the signal was lost.
Mars 6 lander	(Soviet Union) USSR	12 March 1974	23.90°S 19.42°W	Contact lost at landing.
Viking 1 lander	(United States) USA	20 July 1976	22.697°N 48.222°W	Successful soft landing. First to send images in color, as well as to perform in situ biological experiments with the Martian soil.
Viking 2 lander	(United States) USA	3 September 1976	48.269°N 134.010°E	Successful soft landing.
Mars Pathfinder and Sojourner rover	(United States) USA	4 July 1997	19.13°N 33.22°W	First airbag landing on Mars and first Mars rover.
Mars Polar Lander and two penetrators Deep Space 2	(United States) USA	3 December 1999	73°N 210°W	Contact lost prior to landing.
Beagle 2	(United Kingdom) UK/ ESA	25 December 2003	11.5265°N 90.4295°E	Successful soft landing. No contact due to solar "petals" not deploying fully, blocking antenna.
MER-A Spirit	(United States) USA	3 January 2004	14.5718°S 175.4785°E	Mars rover. Contact lost 22 March 2010.
MER-B Opportunity	(United States) USA	25 January 2004	1.9462°S 5.5266°W	Mars rover. Contact lost 10 June 2018.
Phoenix	(United States) USA	25 May 2008	68.2188°N 125.7492°W	Successful soft landing in the north polar region.
Mars Science Laboratory (Curiosity)	(United States) USA	6 August 2012	4.5895°S 137.4417°E	Mars rover. Landed in Gale Crater.
ExoMars Schiaparelli EDM lander	ESA (Russia) RFSA	19 October 2016	2.07°S 353.79°E	Contact lost after entry and parachute deployment, but before planned landing. Hard impact on the surface.
InSight	(United States) USA	26 November 2018	4.5°N 135.9°E	Successful soft landing.
Mars 2020 Perseverance rover and Ingenuity helicopter	(United States) USA	18 February 2021	18.4447°N 77.4508°E	Mars rover and helicopter. Successful soft landing in Jezero Crater. Helicopter deployed from rover on 3 April 2021.
Tianwen-1 lander and Zhurong rover	China	14 May 2021	25.1°N 109.9°E	Successful soft landing in Utopia Planitia. Zhurong rover deployed on 22 May 2021.

=== Jupiter ===
Jupiter is a gas giant with a very large atmospheric pressure and internal temperature and thus there is no known hard surface on which to "land". All missions listed here are impacts on Jupiter.

Mission	Country/Agency	Date of landing/impact	Notes
Galileo atmospheric probe	(United States) USA	7 December 1995	Atmospheric probe of Jupiter.
Galileo	(United States) USA	21 September 2003	Main craft was intentionally directed at Jupiter and disintegrated in Jovian atmosphere.

=== Saturn ===
Saturn is a gas giant with a very large atmospheric pressure and internal temperature and thus there is no known hard surface on which to "land". All missions listed here are impacts on Saturn.

Mission	Country/ Agency	Date of landing/impact	Notes
Cassini orbiter	(United States) USA	15 September 2017	Main craft was intentionally directed at Saturn and disintegrated in Saturn's atmosphere

== Planetary moons ==
=== Earth's Moon ===
Mission	Country/Agency	Date of landing/impact	Coordinates	Notes
Luna 2	(Soviet Union) USSR	13 September 1959	29.1°N -0°E	Intentional hard impact.
Ranger 4	(United States) USA	26 April 1962	15.5°S 130.7°W	Unintentional hard impact; hit lunar far side due to failure of navigation system.
Ranger 6	(United States) USA	2 February 1964	9.4°N 21.5°E	Intentional hard impact.
Ranger 7	(United States) USA	31 July 1964	10.35°S 20.58°W	Intentional hard impact.
Ranger 8	(United States) USA	20 February 1965	2.72°N 24.61°E	Intentional hard impact.
Ranger 9	(United States) USA	24 March 1965	12.83°S 2.37°W	Intentional hard impact.
Luna 5	(Soviet Union) USSR	12 May 1965	31°S 8°W	Unsuccessful attempt at soft landing; crashed into Moon.
Luna 7	(Soviet Union) USSR	7 October 1965	9.8°N 47.8°W	Unsuccessful attempt at soft landing; crashed into Moon.
Luna 8	(Soviet Union) USSR	6 December 1965	9.6°N 62°W	Unsuccessful attempt at soft landing; crashed into Moon.
Luna 9	(Soviet Union) USSR	3 February 1966	7.13°N 64.37°W	First successful soft landing; first pictures from the surface.
Surveyor 1	(United States) USA	2 June 1966	2.47°S 43.33°W	Soft landing.
Surveyor 2	(United States) USA	23 September 1966	04.0°S 11.0°W	Unsuccessful attempt at soft landing; crashed into Moon.
Lunar Orbiter 1	(United States) USA	29 October 1966	6.35°N 160.72°E	Lunar orbiter, intentionally crashed at end of mission.
Luna 13	(Soviet Union) USSR	24 December 1966	18°52′N 62°3′W	Soft landing.
Surveyor 3	(United States) USA	20 April 1967	3.028175°S 23.458208°W	Soft landing. First lander visited by a later crewed mission (Apollo 12) that even brought its components.
Surveyor 4	(United States) USA	17 July 1967	0.45°N 1.39°W	Contact lost on descent.
Surveyor 5	(United States) USA	11 September 1967	1.46°N 23.20°E	Soft landing.
Surveyor 6	(United States) USA	10 November 1967	0.49°N 1.40°W	Soft landing.
Surveyor 7	(United States) USA	10 January 1968	40.86°S 11.47°W	Soft landing.
Apollo 11	(United States) USA	20 July 1969	0°40′26.69″N 23°28′22.69″E	First crewed landing on an extraterrestrial body.
Luna 15	(Soviet Union) USSR	21 July 1969	17°N 60°E	Possible attempted sample return; crashed into Moon. Not a crewed mission.
Apollo 12	(United States) USA	18 November 1969	3.012389°S 23.421569°W	Crewed mission.
Apollo 13	(United States) USA	14 April 1970	N/A	S-IVB stage crashed for seismic research (rocket stages from some other Apollo missions that successfully landed were also crashed in this manner)
Luna 16	(Soviet Union) USSR	20 September 1970	0°41′S 56°18′E	First successful robotic sample return.
Luna 17/Lunokhod 1	(Soviet Union) USSR	17 November 1970	38°17′N 35°0′W	Robotic lunar rover.
Apollo 14	(United States) USA	5 February 1971	3°38′43.08″S 17°28′16.90″W	Crewed mission.
Apollo 15	(United States) USA	30 July 1971	26°7′55.99″N 3°38′1.90″E	Crewed mission; lunar rover.
Luna 18	(Soviet Union) USSR	11 September 1971	3°34′N 56°30′E	Failed attempt at sample return; probable crash-landing.
Luna 20	(Soviet Union) USSR	21 February 1972	3°32′N 56°33′E	Robotic sample return.
Apollo 16	(United States) USA	21 April 1972	8°58′22.84″S 15°30′0.68″E	Crewed mission; lunar rover.
Apollo 17	(United States) USA	7 December 1972	20°11′26.88″N 30°46′18.05″E	Crewed mission; lunar rover. Last crewed landing on extraterrestrial bodies to date.
Luna 21/Lunokhod 2	(Soviet Union) USSR	8 January 1973	25°51′N 30°27′E	Robotic lunar rover.
Luna 23	(Soviet Union) USSR	6 November 1974	12.6669°N 62.1511°E	Failed attempt at sample return; damaged on landing. Operated for 3 days on the surface.
Luna 24	(Soviet Union) USSR	18 August 1976	12°45′N 62°12′E	Robotic sample return.
Hiten	Japan	10 April 1993	34.3°S 55.6°E	Lunar orbiter, intentionally crashed at end of mission.
Lunar Prospector	(United States) USA	31 July 1999	87.7°S 42.1°E	Lunar orbiter, intentionally crashed into polar crater at end of mission to test for liberation of water vapour (not detected).
SMART-1	ESA	3 September 2006	34.262°S 46.193°W	Lunar orbiter, intentionally crashed at end of mission.
Chandrayaan-1 Moon Impact Probe	India	14 November 2008	89.55°S 122.93°W	Impactor. Water found.
SELENE Rstar (Okina)	Japan	12 February 2009	28.213°N 159.033°W	Lunar orbiter, intentionally crashed at end of mission.
Chang'e 1	China	1 March 2009	1.50°S 52.36°E	Lunar orbiter, intentionally crashed at end of mission.
Kaguya	Japan	10 June 2009	65.50°S 80.4°E	Lunar orbiter, intentionally crashed at end of mission.
LCROSS (Centaur)	USA	9 October 2009	84.675°S 48.725°W; 84.729°S 49.360°W	Impactors. Water confirmed.
LCROSS (Shepherding Spacecraft)	USA	9 October 2009	84.675°S 48.725°W; 84.729°S 49.360°W	Impactors. Water confirmed.
Chang'e 3	China	14 December 2013	44.12°N 19.51°W	First soft landing on the Moon since 1976, lunar rover.
Chang'e 4	China	3 January 2019	45.5°S 177.6°E	First soft landing on the far side of the Moon, lunar rover.
Beresheet	Israel	11 April 2019	32.5956°N 19.3496°E	Israeli lunar lander crash landed on the Moon.
Chandrayaan-2	India	8 September 2019	70.8810°S 22.7840°E	First attempt to land near the Moon's south pole; lost contact at 2.1 km and crashed.
Chang'e 5	China	1 December 2020	43.0576°N 51.9161°W	First lunar sample return mission by China. Sample successfully returned to Earth on 16 December 2020.
Chang'e 5	China	7 December 2020	30°S 0°E	Intentional impact of ascent stage after delivering sample to orbiter.
Hakuto-R Mission 1	Japan	25 April 2023	47.581°N 44.094°E	Unsuccessful attempt; contact was lost before landing alongside the lander being crash-landed.
Luna 25	Russia	19 August 2023	57.865°S 61.360°E	Unsuccessful attempt; crashed on lunar surface after failure during lunar orbit insertion.
Chandrayaan-3	India	23 August 2023	69.373°S 32.319°E	Soft landing. First Indian soft landing. First soft landing in the south pole region of the Moon. Lunar rover.
Smart Lander for Investigating Moon (SLIM)	Japan	19 January 2024	13.316°S 25.251°E	Soft landing. First Japanese soft landing. Two lunar rovers.
IM-1 Odysseus	USA	22 February 2024	80.13°S 1.44°E	First successful soft landing by a commercial lander (Nova-C lander made by Intuitive Machines).
Chang'e 6	China	1 June 2024	41.6385°S 153.9852°W	First far side lunar sample return mission by China. Sample returned to Earth in June 2024.
Chang'e 6	China	6 June 2024	39.0°S 180.0°E	Intentional impact of ascent stage conducted after delivering sample to orbiter.
Blue Ghost M1 TO 19D	USA	2 March 2025	18.56°N 61.81°E	Commercial Blue Ghost lander made by Firefly Aerospace. Successful soft landing at Mare Crisium near Mons Latreille.
IM-2 Athena	USA	6 March 2025	85°S 31°W	Commercial Nova-C lander made by Intuitive Machines, damaged on landing. Operated for less than a day on the surface.
Hakuto-R Mission 2 Resilience	Japan	5 June 2025	60.5°N 4.6°W	Commercial Hakuto-R lander made by ispace Inc.. Unsuccessful attempt; contact was lost before landing alongside the lander being crash-landed.
KLEP	KOR	NET NET 2032		Second mission of the Korean Lunar Exploration Program.

=== Moons of Saturn ===
Titan

Mission	Country/Agency	Date of landing/impact	Coordinates	Notes
Huygens probe	ESA	14 January 2005	10.2936°S 163.1775°E	Titan floating lander. Successful soft landing. Transmitted data for 90 minutes following landing.

== Other bodies ==
=== Asteroids ===
Body	Mission	Country/Agency	Date of landing/impact	Notes
Eros	NEAR Shoemaker	(United States) USA	12 February 2001	Designed as an orbiter, but an improvised landing was carried out on completion of the main mission. Transmission from the surface continued for about 16 days.
Itokawa	Hayabusa	Japan	19 November 2005	Accidentally stayed for 30 min.
Itokawa	Hayabusa	Japan	25 November 2005	Stayed for 1 sec. Sample return (very small amount of dust successfully returned to Earth).
Ryugu	Hayabusa2	Japan	21 September 2018	MINERVA-II Rover-1A and Rover-1B, deployed successfully and returned data from the surface.
Ryugu	Hayabusa2	France / Germany	3 October 2018	MASCOT rover, deployed successfully and returned data from the surface.
Ryugu	Hayabusa2	Japan	21 February 2019	Hayabusa2 first touchdown. Successfully collected sample from the surface. Sample returned to Earth on 5 December 2020.
Ryugu	Hayabusa2	Japan	5 April 2019	Small Carry-on Impactor (SCI), fired at surface to create a crater from which to sample sub-surface material
Ryugu	Hayabusa2	Japan	April 2019	Deployable Camera 3, photographed the impact created by the Small carry-on Impactor. Presumed to have fallen on the asteroid.
Ryugu	Hayabusa2	Japan	11 July 2019	Hayabusa2 second touchdown. Successfully collected sub-surface material sample from the crater created by the SCI. Sample returned to Earth on 5 December 2020.
Ryugu	Hayabusa2	Japan	October 2019	MINERVA-II Rover-2, failed before deployment, so it was released in orbit around the asteroid to perform gravitational measurements before it impacted a few days later.
Bennu	OSIRIS-REx	(United States) USA	20 October 2020	OSIRIS-REx touchdown, collected sample from surface. Sample returned to Earth on 24 September 2023
Dimorphos	Double Asteroid Redirection Test	(United States) USA	26 September 2022	Intentional hard impact. First Solar System body intentionally deviated (slightly) off its orbit.
Kamoʻoalewa	Tianwen-2	China	4 July 2026 (rendezvous within 20 km)	Sample collection will be attempted in the next 8 months; once samples are collected, the spacecraft will depart the asteroid on 24 April 2027, and dropped in a flyby to Earth in latter part of 2027. The mission will then continue to comet 311P/PanSTARRS.

=== Comets ===
Body	Mission	Country/Agency	Date of landing/impact	Notes
Comet 9P/Tempel 1	Deep Impact	(United States) USA	4 July 2005	Impactor.
Comet 67P/Churyumov–Gerasimenko	Rosetta	ESA	12 November 2014	Philae lander. Successful soft landing, but anchors misfired and Philae bounced multiple times before coming to rest. Philae transmitted briefly but could not maintain power due to its awkward landing.
Comet 67P/Churyumov–Gerasimenko	Rosetta	ESA	29 September 2016	The Rosetta orbiter was intentionally crashed into the comet.

== See also ==
- Deliberate crash landings on extraterrestrial bodies
- List of artificial objects on extraterrestrial surfaces
- List of extraterrestrial orbiters
- List of rovers on extraterrestrial bodies
- Timeline of space exploration
