= List of extraterrestrial orbiters =

This list of extraterrestrial orbiters is a listing of spacecraft that achieved an extraterrestrial orbit.

== Legend ==
Color legend for orbital status
Inactive
Unclear
En-Route
Operational

== Sun ==
The first artificial object to orbit the sun is the Luna 1. The spacecraft was originally designed to intentionally crash into the moon, and, after missing its target in 1959, inadvertently became the first human-made object to ever leave Earth's orbit and circle around the Sun, where it remained to this day.

== Moon ==
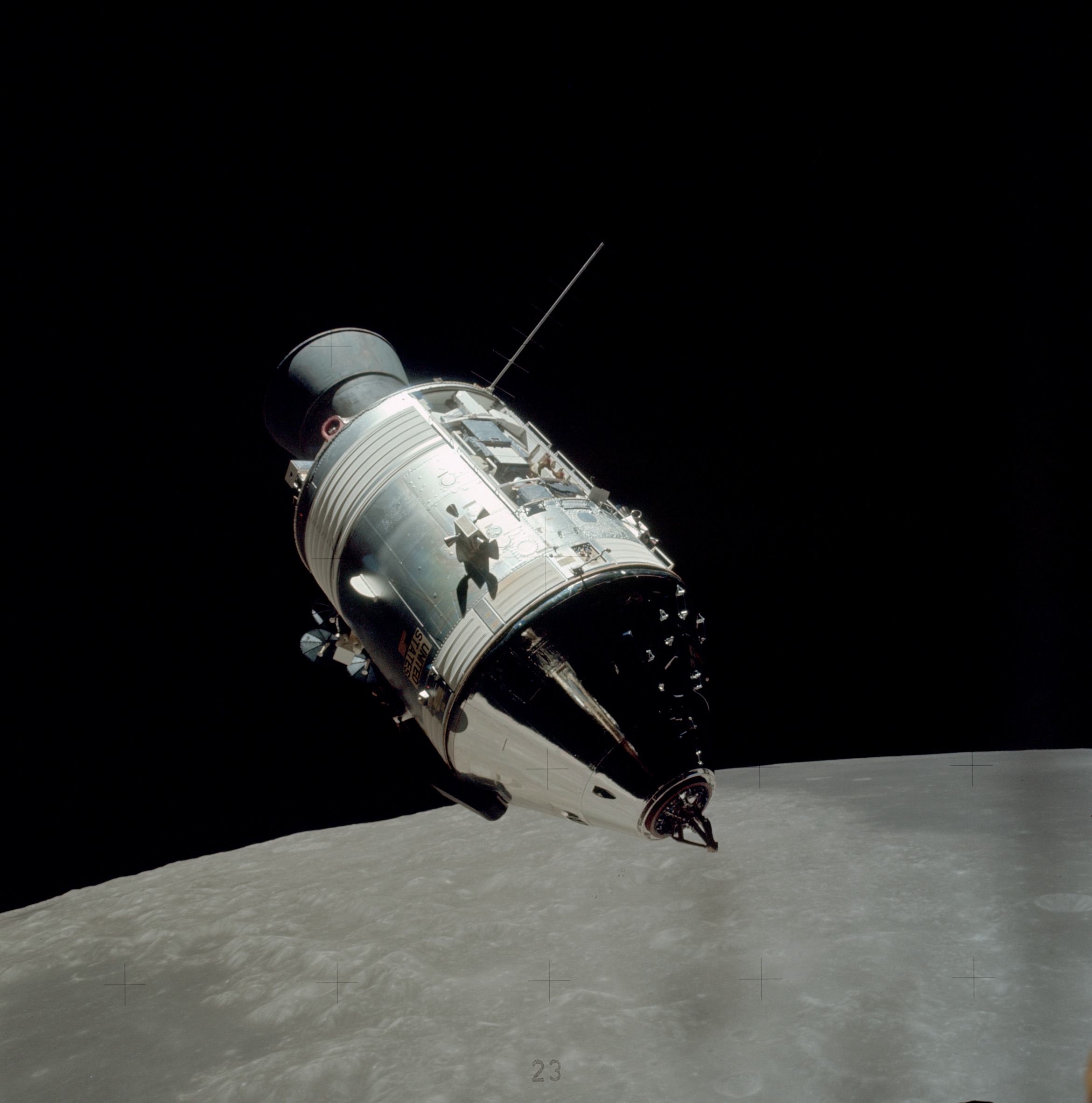
The Apollo 17 Command Module America seen in lunar orbit from the ascent stage of the Lunar Module

Mission	Country/agency	Orbital insertion	Current status	Notes
Luna 10	(Soviet Union) USSR	3 April 1966	Contact lost 30 May 1966, probably decayed the same year	First extraterrestrial and Moon orbiter
Lunar Orbiter 1	(United States) USA	14 August 1966	Impacted lunar surface 29 October 1966	First U.S. extraterrestrial orbiter
Luna 11	(Soviet Union) USSR	27 August 1966	Contact lost 1 October 1966, probably decayed the same or following year	
Luna 12	(Soviet Union) USSR	25 October 1966	Contact lost 19 January 1967, probably decayed the same year	
Lunar Orbiter 2	(United States) USA	Launched 6 November 1966	Impacted lunar surface 11 October 1967	
Lunar Orbiter 3	(United States) USA	8 February 1967	Impacted lunar surface 9 October 1967	
Lunar Orbiter 4	(United States) USA	Launched 4 May 1967	Contact lost 17 July 1967, impacted lunar surface 6 October 1967	
Explorer 35	(United States) USA	Launched 19 July 1967	Deactivated 24 June 1973; impacted lunar surface in the middle to late 1970s	
Lunar Orbiter 5	(United States) USA	5 August 1967	Deorbited; impacted lunar surface 31 January 1968	
Luna 14	(Soviet Union) USSR	10 April 1968	Mission terminated 24 June 1968, its orbit probably decayed	
Luna 19	(Soviet Union) USSR	2 October 1971	Mission terminated 20 October 1972 and contact lost on 1 November 1972, probably decayed the following year	
Explorer 49	(United States) USA	Launched 10 June 1973	Contact lost August 1977, its orbit probably decayed	
Luna 22	(Soviet Union) USSR	2 June 1974	Mission terminated November 1975, its orbit probably decayed in 1976	
Apollo 8	(United States) USA	Launched 21 December 1968; entered orbit after 69 hrs	Left orbit after 10 orbits; splashdown on Earth	First crewed lunar orbit
Apollo 10	(United States) USA	Launched 18 May 1969	Left orbit 26 May 1969	
Apollo 11	(United States) USA	July 19, 1969	July 21, 1969; Lunar module ascent stage abandoned in orbit, impact site unknown	First human Moon landing
Apollo 12	(United States) USA	November 18, 1969	November 21, 1969	Human Moon landing
Apollo 14	(United States) USA	February 4, 1971	February 7, 1971	Human Moon landing
Apollo 15	(United States) USA	July 29, 1971	August 4, 1971	Human Moon landing
Apollo 15 subsatellite (PFS-1)	(United States) USA	August 4, 1971	January 1973	
Apollo 16	(United States) USA	April 19, 1972	April 25, 1972; Lunar module ascent stage abandoned in orbit, impact site unknown	Human Moon landing
Apollo 16 subsatellite (PFS-2)	(United States) USA	April 24, 1972	May 29, 1972	
Apollo 17	(United States) USA	December 11, 1972	December 14, 1972	Human Moon landing
Hiten and Hagoromo	Japan	Hiten: 15 February 1993	Hiten was deliberately deorbited and impacted the lunar surface 10 April 1993	First Japanese lunar orbiter
Clementine	(United States) USA	Launched 25 January 1994	Left lunar orbit and entered heliocentric orbit; contact lost June 1994	
Lunar Prospector	(United States) USA	Launched 7 January 1998	Deliberately deorbited; impacted lunar surface 31 July 1999	
SMART-1	ESA	11 November 2004	Deliberately deorbited; impacted lunar surface 3 September 2006	
SELENE (Kaguya, Okina and Ouna)	Japan	3 October 2007	Deliberately deorbited; impacted lunar surface 10 June 2009	
Chang'e 1	China	5 November 2007	Deliberately deorbited 1 March 2009; impacted the Moon's surface.	First Chinese lunar orbiter
Chandrayaan-1	India	8 November 2008	Deliberately crashed into lunar surface. Impact probe remained operational for a few days. Contact lost 29 August 2009.	First Indian lunar orbiter
Lunar Reconnaissance Orbiter	(United States) USA	23 June 2009	Active	
Chang'e 2	China	6 October 2010	Left lunar orbit 8 June 2011; currently in deep-space orbit	
ARTEMIS P1	(United States) USA	2 July 2011	Active	
ARTEMIS P2	(United States) USA	17 July 2011	Active	
Gravity Recovery and Interior Laboratory (GRAIL)	(United States) USA	31 December 2011 / 1 January 2012	Both spacecraft were deliberately deorbited and impacted on the lunar surface 17 December 2012	
LADEE	(United States) USA	6 October 2013	Deliberately deorbited 18 April 2014	
Chang'e 3	China	6 December 2013	Landed on lunar surface 14 December 2013	First Chinese lunar landing
Chang'e 5-T1	China	13 January 2015	Returned to Earth on 31 October 2014	
Chang'e 4	China	12 December 2018	Landed on lunar surface 3 January 2019. The Queqiao relay satellite was placed in an Earth-Moon L_{2} halo orbit.	First lunar far-side landing
Longjiang-2 microsatellite	China	25 May 2018	Deorbited 2019	
Beresheet	Israel	4 April 2019	Crashed onto lunar surface 11 April 2019	First private lunar lander. Successfully orbited for 7 days. Soft landing failed.
Chandrayaan-2	India	20 August 2019	Orbiter is active. The Vikram lander lost contact at 2.1 km from the lunar surface, and was subsequently destroyed.	It was originally thought that Vikram had survived the impact, and ISRO continued trying to contact the lander until the lunar night.
Chang'e 5	China	1 December 2020	Orbiter is As of 2022 in lunar DRO orbit.	First lunar sample return mission by China. Ascent stage deorbited on 7 December 2020. Capsule successfully returned sample via service module on 16 December 2020. The orbiter will make lunar flyby in extended mission on 9 September 2021 in Distant retrograde orbit.
CAPSTONE	(United States) USA	14 November 2022	Active and on a Near-rectilinear halo orbit (NRHO)	Lunar orbiting CubeSat that will test and verify the calculated orbital stability planned for the Gateway space station.
Artemis 1	(United States) USA	25 November 2022	Remained on a Selenocentric orbit (DRO) until 5 December 2022, then returned to Earth	First mission of the Artemis program.
LunaH-Map	(United States) USA	25 November 2022	Decayed 20 February 2023	
Lunar IceCube	(United States) USA	25 November 2022	On a Selenocentric orbit	Contact lost shortly after the launch. Conducted lunar flyby on 21 November 2022, likely in a heliocentric orbit.
Danuri KPLO	(United States) USA / South Korea	16 December 2022	On a Selenocentric orbit	Lunar Orbiter by the Korea Aerospace Research Institute (KARI) of South Korea. The orbiter, its science payload and ground control infrastructure are technology demonstrators. The orbiter will also be tasked with surveying lunar resources such as water ice, uranium, helium-3, silicon, and aluminium, and produce a topographic map to help select future lunar landing sites.
Hakuto-R Mission 1	Japan	21 March 2023	Crashed onto lunar surface on 25 April 2023	Carried the emirati Rashid and the Japanese SORA-Q lunar rovers. Contact lost during landing attempt.
Chandrayaan-3	India	5 August 2023	Success (returned to Earth Orbit)	Propulsion module, also functioning as a Chandrayaan-3 relay satellite. Conducted 4 flybys enroute return to Earth's orbit.
Luna 25	Russia	16 August 2023	Crashed onto lunar surface on 19 August 2023	Lunar south pole lander, landing scheduled for 21 August 2023. Contact lost after orbit lowering maneuver.
SLIM	Japan	25 December 2023	Landed on Lunar surface on 19 January 2024	Carried the Japanese LEV-1 and LEV-2 lunar rovers. First Japanese soft landing.
IM-1 Odysseus	(United States) USA	21 February 2024	Landed on lunar surface on 22 February 2024	Carried the American EagleCam cubesat.
Queqiao-2	China	24 March 2024	On a Selenocentric orbit	
Tiandu-1	China	24 March 2024	On a Selenocentric orbit	
Tiandu-2	China	24 March 2024	On a Selenocentric orbit	
DRO A/B	China	~20 August 2024	On a Selenocentric orbit	Yuanzheng 1S upper stage failed to deliver spacecraft into correct orbit. The satellites were intended to test Distant retrograde orbit. Tracking data appears to show China is attempting to salvage spacecraft and they appear to have succeeded in reaching their desired orbit.
Chang'e 6	China	8 May 2024	Left lunar orbit 21 June 2024; currently at Sun Earth L2	First lunar sample return mission from far side and south pole of Moon by China. Ascent stage was deorbited on 6 June 2024. The capsule returned the sample via service module on 25 June 2024.
ICUBE-Q	Pakistan	8 May 2024	On a Selenocentric orbit	First Pakistani lunar mission, piggybacking with Chang'e 6.
Blue Ghost M1	(United States) USA	13 February 2025	Landed on lunar surface on 2 March 2025	
Hakuto-R Mission 2 Resilience	Japan	5 June 2025	Crash landed.	Carried the Tenacious rover made by Luxembourg.
IM-2 Athena	(United States) USA	3 March 2025	Landed on lunar surface on 6 March 2025	Carried MAPP LV1, Micro-Nova, AstroAnt and Yaoki rover, each built by different organisations.

== Mars ==
Mission	Country/agency	Orbital insertion	Current status	Notes
Mariner 9	(United States) USA	14 November 1971	Deactivated 27 October 1972. In derelict orbit around Mars, expected to decay no sooner than 2022	First spacecraft to orbit another planet First Mars orbiter
Mars 2 orbiter	(Soviet Union) USSR	27 November 1971	Mission terminated 22 August 1972; spacecraft in derelict orbit	First Soviet spacecraft to orbit Mars
Mars 3 orbiter	(Soviet Union) USSR	2 December 1971	Mission terminated on August 22, 1972	
Mars 5 orbiter	(Soviet Union) USSR	12 February 1974	Contact lost on 28 February 1974 due to a loss of pressurization in the transmitter	
Viking 1 orbiter	(United States) USA	19 June 1976	Mission terminated 17 August 1980, spacecraft in derelict high altitude orbit.	
Viking 2 orbiter	(United States) USA	7 August 1976	Mission terminated 25 July 1978, spacecraft in derelict high altitude orbit.	
Phobos 2	(Soviet Union) USSR	29 January 1989	Contact lost 27 March 1989	
Mars Global Surveyor	(United States) USA	11 September 1997	Contact lost 2 November 2006; In derelict orbit around Mars, expected to decay no sooner than 2047	
2001 Mars Odyssey	(United States) USA	24 October 2001	Active	Longest-surviving, continuously active spacecraft in orbit around another planet
Mars Express	ESA	20 December 2003	Active	
Mars Reconnaissance Orbiter	(United States) USA	10 March 2006	Active	
MAVEN	(United States) USA	22 September 2014	Active	
Mars Orbiter Mission	India	24 September 2014	Contact lost April 2022	India's first interplanetary mission
ExoMars Trace Gas Orbiter	ESA	19 October 2016	Active	Carried Schiaparelli EDM lander
Emirates Mars Mission (Hope)	(United Arab Emirates) UAE	9 February 2021	Active	United Arab Emirates's first interplanetary mission
Tianwen 1	China	10 February 2021	Active	Tianwen-1 is China's first interplanetary mission, which consists of an orbiter, a lander, and a rover named Zhurong.

== Venus ==
Mission	Country/agency	Orbital insertion	Current status	Notes
Venera 9	(Soviet Union) USSR	22 October 1975	Mission terminated on March 22, 1976	First Venus orbiter
Venera 10	(Soviet Union) USSR	23 October 1975	Contact lost sometime in June 1976	
Pioneer Venus Orbiter	(United States) USA	4 December 1978	Contact lost 8 October 1992; Atmospheric entry disintegration on 22 October 1992.	
Venera 15	(Soviet Union) USSR	10 October 1983	Contact lost January 5, 1985	
Venera 16	(Soviet Union) USSR	11 October 1983	Contact lost June 13, 1984	
Magellan	(United States) USA	7 August 1990	Contact lost 13 October 1994. Deliberately deorbited into Venus' atmosphere.	
Venus Express	ESA	11 April 2006	Contact lost 16 December 2014: Atmospheric entry disintegration in January 2015	
Akatsuki	Japan	7 December 2015	Contact lost April 2024	

== Jupiter ==
Mission	Country/agency	Orbital insertion	Current status	Notes
Galileo	(United States) USA	8 December 1995	Intentionally deorbited and incinerated in Jupiter's atmosphere 21 September 2003	First Jupiter orbiter
Juno	(United States) USA	4 July 2016	Active	
JUICE	ESA	July 2031 (planned)	en route	mission to study Jupiter's three icy moons Callisto, Europa and Ganymede, eventually orbiting Ganymede as the first spacecraft to orbit a satellite of another planet.
Europa Clipper	(United States) USA	11 April 2030 (planned)	en route	planned to orbit Jupiter and fly by Europa multiple times.

== Saturn ==
Mission	Country/agency	Orbital insertion	Current status	Notes
Cassini-Huygens	(United States) USA; ESA (Italy) ASI	1 July 2004	Intentionally deorbited and incinerated in Saturn's atmosphere 15 September 2017	First Saturn orbiter

== Mercury ==
Mission	Country/agency	Orbital insertion	Current status	Notes
MESSENGER	(United States) USA	18 March 2011	Deliberately crashed into surface 30 April 2015. Impact probably around 54.4° N, 149.9° W, near the crater Janáček.	First Mercury orbiter
BepiColombo	ESA Japan	November 2026 (planned)	en route	Consists of two satellites, the ESA's Mercury Planetary Orbiter (MPO) and Japan's Mercury Magnetospheric Orbiter (MMO).

== Minor planets and comets ==
Mission	Country/agency	Object	Orbital insertion	Current status	Notes
NEAR Shoemaker	(United States) USA	433 Eros	14 February 2000	Landed 12 February 2001 on the surface of Eros.	First spacecraft to orbit an asteroid
Dawn	(United States) USA	4 Vesta	16 July 2011	Left Vesta orbit 5 September 2012	
Dawn	(United States) USA	Ceres	9 March 2015	Mission concluded 1 November 2018. In derelict orbit around Ceres, expected to decay no sooner than 2038	First spacecraft to achieve orbit around two separate objects and to orbit a dwarf planet.
Rosetta	ESA	67P/Churyumov–Gerasimenko	6 August 2014	On 30 September 2016, ended its mission by landing on the comet in its Ma'at region.	First spacecraft to orbit a comet. Philae lander module successfully landed on 12 November 2014
OSIRIS-REx	(United States) USA	101955 Bennu	31 December 2018	Collected surface sample and departed from Bennu on 20 October 2020	Smallest body to be orbited by spacecraft and closest ever orbit
Tianwen-2	China	469219 Kamoʻoalewa	7 June 2026	Approaching the asteroid to perform a rendez-vous	Second mission of the Planetary Exploration of China program.
Psyche	(United States) USA	16 Psyche	August 2029 (planned)	enroute	Selected for mission #14 of NASA's Discovery Program to explore a metallic asteroid.
Hera, Milani and Juventas	ESA	65803 Didymos and Dimorphos	11 December 2026 (planned)	enroute	studying effects of DART's impact on the asteroid
OSIRIS-APEX	(United States) USA	99942 Apophis	April 2029 (planned)	enroute	Rendezvous will occur after Apophis's 13 April 2029 flyby of Earth

== See also ==
- Lunar orbit
- Circumlunar trajectory
- List of minor planets and comets visited by spacecraft
- List of landings on extraterrestrial bodies
- List of interplanetary voyages
- Satellite system (astronomy)
