= Alexander V. Zakharov =

Chief scientist, Russian Space Research Institute (born 1941)

Alexander Valentinovich Zakharov
- Born: June 1, 1941 (age 85); Moscow, Russia
- Education: Moscow Aviation Institute; Moscow State University
- Scientific career
- Fields: Plasma physics
- Workplaces: Russian Space Research Institute

Alexander Valentinovich Zakharov (Russian: Алекса́ндр Валенти́нович Заха́ров, born June 1, 1941) is a Soviet and Russian chief scientist and astronomer serving at the Russian Space Research Institute (IKI).

He was a lead scientist of the failed Mars missions, Mars 96 and Fobos-Grunt.

== Biography ==
Three days after the end of Mars 96, Zakharov came up to the conclusion that there was a flaw in the spacecraft control system, and proposed another attempt for another Mars mission.

In 1999, he became a project scientist on the feasibility of the Fobos-Grunt sample return mission.

In November 2007, he was interviewed by Mat Kaplan on Planetary Radio along with Bruce Betts and Tom Duxbury.

In 2008, he became a member of The Planetary Society's Living Interplanetary Flight Experiment team. He was responsible for placing the LIFE biomodule into the return capsule.

He forwarded the letter about the Fobos-Grunt failure to the Planetary Society members. After the probe's fall into the southern Pacific Ocean on January 15, 2012, he commented that this crash was a tragedy for the Russian scientific community, and that with soil samples from Phobos his team could uncover information about the solar system's origins. Later, he told Reuters about the possible reasons of the probe stranded in low Earth orbit, but doesn't rule out something. He then suggested there was some kind of problem with the flight system or the programming, which were not designed to guard against the space radiation.

He was hoping that Fobos-Grunt will be repeated as called by IKI's director Lev Zeleny and later acknowledged by Roscosmos in April 2012. However, with an agreement for cooperation with the European Space Agency on ExoMars had been reached, the space agency chose to focus on that program instead, but not ruled out any possible future Phobos sample return mission.

Zakharov will be attending the Asia Oceania Geosciences Society AGU (WPGM) Joint Assembly from 13 to 17 August 2012 at Resorts World Sentosa, Singapore for the presentation on Mars Science and Exploration.

== Bibliography ==
- Zelenyi, L. M.; Zakharov, A. V. (2010). "Phobos-Grunt project: Devices for scientific studies". Solar System Research. 44 (5): 359. Bibcode:2010SoSyR..44..359Z. doi:10.1134/S0038094610050011. S2CID 121719627.
