= Moscow State School 444 =

Coordinates: 55.7906°N 37.7964°E

- Школа № 444

Location
- 14 Nizhnyaya Pervomayskaya Street, Izmaylovo; Moscow; Russia

Information
- Type: State secondary school
- Established: 1953
- Specialist: Mathematics and computer science

Moscow State School No. 444 (Russian: Школа № 444) is a state secondary school in the Izmaylovo district of Moscow, Russia, specialising in the advanced study of mathematics and computer science. Founded in 1953, it was one of the first physics-and-mathematics schools in Moscow.

== History ==
The school was founded in 1953. In 1959 the mathematics educator Semyon Shvartsburd established at School No. 444 one of the first specialised mathematics classes in the country, which marked the beginning of its development into a physics-and-mathematics school. The school subsequently operated as a physics-and-mathematics laboratory school with in-depth study of mathematics and computer science.

== Brest Fortress Museum ==
The school houses a museum dedicated to the defenders of the Brest Fortress, named after the regimental commissar Yefim Fomin. It originated in 1958, after a school expedition to Brest led by several teachers, including the mathematics teacher Yakov Chernyak, whose collected items formed the basis of an exhibition; the museum received official status in 1975.

== Awards and recognition ==
The school was named "School of the Year of Russia" in 1997 and 1998, and received the honorary "School of the Century" diploma in 2001.

== Notable people ==
=== Alumni ===
- Arkady Dvorkovich – economist and statesman; Deputy Prime Minister of Russia (2012–2018) and President of FIDE
- Alexander Zhukov – economist and politician
- Lev Zelyony – physicist, member of the Russian Academy of Sciences
- Daniil Dubov – chess grandmaster
- Andrey Movchan – economist and financier

=== Faculty ===
- Semyon Shvartsburd – mathematician and educator, founder of the school's first mathematics class
- Naum Vilenkin – mathematician
- Yakov Chernyak – mathematics teacher, founder of the school's Brest Fortress museum
- Mikhail Shishkin – writer; taught German and English at the school
