= Trenin =

Trenin may refer to:

- Dmitri Trenin, the director of the Carnegie Moscow Center think tank
- Yakov Trenin, Russian ice hockey player
- Trenin, a character in a comic book entitled, The First
