= Dmitri Trenin =

Former director of the Carnegie Moscow Center

- Дмитрий Тренин
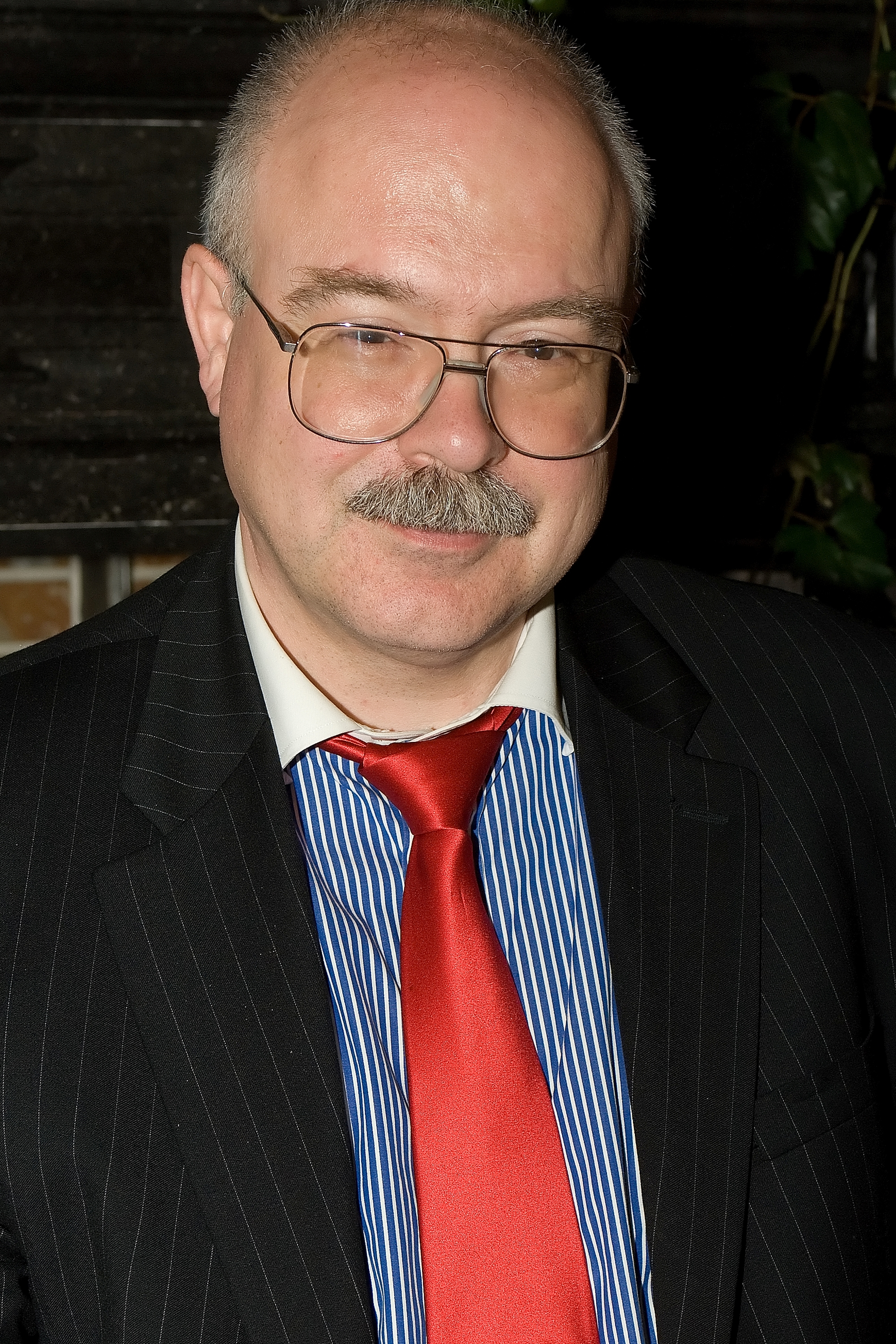
- Born: 11 September 1955; Moscow (Soviet Union)
- Education: Military Institute of the USSR Ministry of Defence, Institute for US and Canadian Studies
- Occupations: Political scientist, historian, author

Dmitri Vitalyevich Trenin (Russian: Дмитрxий Витальевич Тренин) is a member of Russia's Foreign and Defence Policy Council. He was the director of the Carnegie Moscow Center, a Russian think tank. A former colonel of Russian military intelligence, Trenin served for 21 years in the Soviet Army and Russian Ground Forces, before joining Carnegie in 1994.

== Military career ==
Trenin served in the Soviet and Russian armed forces from 1972 to 1993. His service included postings both inside and outside of the Soviet Union, to include a stint as the first non-NATO senior research fellow at the NATO Defense College in Rome.

== Carnegie Moscow Center (1994–2022) ==
Trenin joined the Carnegie Moscow Center (which itself was set up with funding from the Nunn–Lugar Cooperative Threat Reduction) in 1994 soon after its formation in the aftermath of the collapse of the Soviet Union.

On 22 December 2008, Trenin became the first Russian director of the Carnegie Moscow Center. Trenin also chaired Carnegie Moscow's research council and the Foreign and Security Policy Program.

Since its foundation, Carnegie Moscow Center has often been ranked as the leading think tank in Russia in reports by the University of Pennsylvania's Think Tanks and Civil Society Program, the "Global Go To Think Tank Report". The Carnegie Moscow Center, nevertheless, has been closed in February 2022 due to the Russian government's decision, and at the same time the Carnegie Endowment for International Peace ended its affiliation with Dmitri Trenin after he endorsed the Russian invasion of Ukraine.

Trenin is a member of the International Institute for Strategic Studies (London, England), the Russian International Affairs Council (Moscow), and the Russian International Studies Association (Moscow). He is a member of the Board of Trustees of the Moscow School of Political Studies. He is a Senior Network Member at the European Leadership Network (ELN). Trenin was expelled from the Royal Swedish Academy of War Sciences in October 2022 "due to his active support of the unjustified and illegal Russian invasion of Ukraine in both speech and writing".

== Views and criticism ==
During the early-2000s, Trenin became known for his pro-Western stances. In his books, in particular, he claimed Russia should join the European Union and NATO. In 2001, he claimed that "a confrontation with NATO is something Russia cannot afford and should never attempt", and in the same year an American book reviewer described him as "a Russian who is ahead of his time and the vast majority of his countrymen".

His views about the West progressively changed in the 2010s. According to the American neoconservative writer James Kirchick, following the reelection of Vladimir Putin in 2012 the Carnegie Moscow Center, which Trenin led, started to gradually adopt pro-Putin positions: this caused the resignation of chair of the think tank's Society and Regions Program, Nikolai Petrov; the editor-in-chief of the center's magazine, Maria Lipman; and Russian political scientist Lilia Shevtsova. All of them were critics of Putin.

Trenin, on his end, didn't leave Russia after the Russian invasion of Ukraine in 2022, unlike many of his former colleagues, and he even criticised those who did so. The War in Ukraine, according to Trenin, is being used by the US and its allies as a tool "to exclude Russia from world politics as an independent factor, and to completely destroy the Russian economy... to finally resolve the "Russia question" and create favorable prospects for victory in the confrontation with China". As put by the British journalist Anatol Lieven, his continuous call for reforms and anti-corruption measures in Russia are no longer part of a strategy to integrate Russia into the West, but rather to "strengthen Russia and Russian society in order to resist the West and succeed in limited Russian strategic goals in Ukraine".

The radical change in Trenin's narrative around the Russian invasion of Ukraine and Russia–United States relations has been subject of debate. Russian political writer Andrey Piontkovsky referred to Trenin as an "elite Kremlin propagandist targeting the Western expert audience" suggesting that the Carnegie Foundation was complicit in Kremlin propaganda for 30 years – the duration of Trenin's directorship of the Carnegie Moscow Center. Anatol Lieven, who used to work with Trenin, claims on the other hand that "he only represents, in a more abrupt and radical form, a shift in the Russian centrist intelligentsia that has been building up gradually for many years."

== Works ==
=== Authored and co-authored ===
- New Balance of Power: Russia in Search of Foreign Policy Equilibrium (2021)
- Russia (Polity: 2019)
- What Is Russia Up to in the Middle East? (Polity: 2017)
- Should We Fear Russia? (Polity: 2016)
- Russia and the World in the 21st Century (2015)
- Post-Imperium: A Eurasian Story (Washington, DC: 2011)
- 20 Years Without the Berlin Wall: A Breakthrough to Freedom (Moscow: 2011)
- Solo Voyage (Moscow: 2009, in Russian)
- Getting Russia Right (Washington, DC: 2007)
- Central Asia: The Views from Washington, Moscow and Beijing (New York: 2007, co-authored)
- Integration and Identity: Russia as a New West (Moscow: 2006)
- Russland: Die gestrandete Weltmacht (Hamburg, Germany: 2005, in German)
- Russia's Restless Frontier: The Chechnya Factor in Post-Soviet Russia (Washington, DC: 2003, co-authored)
- The End of Eurasia: Russia on the Border Between Geopolitics and Globalization (Washington, DC: 2002, 2001)
- A Strategy for Stable Peace: Toward a Euro-Atlantic Security Community (Washington, DC: 2002, co-authored)
- Russia's China Problem (Washington, DC: 1998)
- Baltic Chance: The Baltic States, Russia and the West in the Emerging Greater Europe (Washington, DC: 1997)

=== Edited ===
- The Challenges of Transition (2011)
- The Russian Military: Power and Policy (2004)
- Ambivalent Neighbors: The NATO and EU Enlargement and the Price of Membership (2003)
- Russia and the Main Security Institutions in Europe: Entering the 21st Century (2000)
- Kosovo: International Aspects of the Crisis (1999)
- Commonwealth and Security in Eurasia (1998)
- Russia in the World Arms Trade: The Strategic, Political, and Economic Dimensions (1997)
