= Insect Habitat =

The Insect Habitat was a science payload intended for the International Space Station as part of the Space Station Biological Research Program (SSBRP). The project was put on hold when Space Shuttle flights were interrupted after the destruction of Orbiter Columbia in February 2003.

The insect research element of the program was managed by the Canadian Space Agency, and the prime contractor for the Insect Habitat was Routes AstroEngineering, of Ottawa, Ontario.

A series of fruit fly Insect Habitat Science Requirements Definition studies were completed at NASA Ames Research Center.

A laboratory website was created for remote science operations testing, Science Requirements Definition studies information and also contained insect space research history and publication references.

== Objective ==
The Insect Habitat would enable studies of the fruit fly to learn how microgravity affects development, nervous system function, movement and behavior, growth, reproduction, aging, gene expression, mutagenesis from radiation and circadian rhythms or sleep/wake cycles. The habitat would have housed eighty-five separate colonies of fruit flies. Each of these was divided into two compartments, separated by a rotating food cartridge. Fruit flies, which have a short life cycle, tend to lay their eggs in their food supply, to provide their offspring with a source of nourishment after hatching. After the eggs were laid, the food cartridge would be rotated, segregating the generations of flies so they could be studied separately. Multigenerartional studies were possible in this way, if each generation was removed from the colony before its offspring's eggs were ready to be segregated.

== See also ==
- Scientific research on the ISS
- Living Interplanetary Flight Experiment

== External link ==
- Biology Habitats on the ISS - NASA
