= Fobos-Grunt =

2011 Russian attempted sample-return mission to the Martian moon Phobos

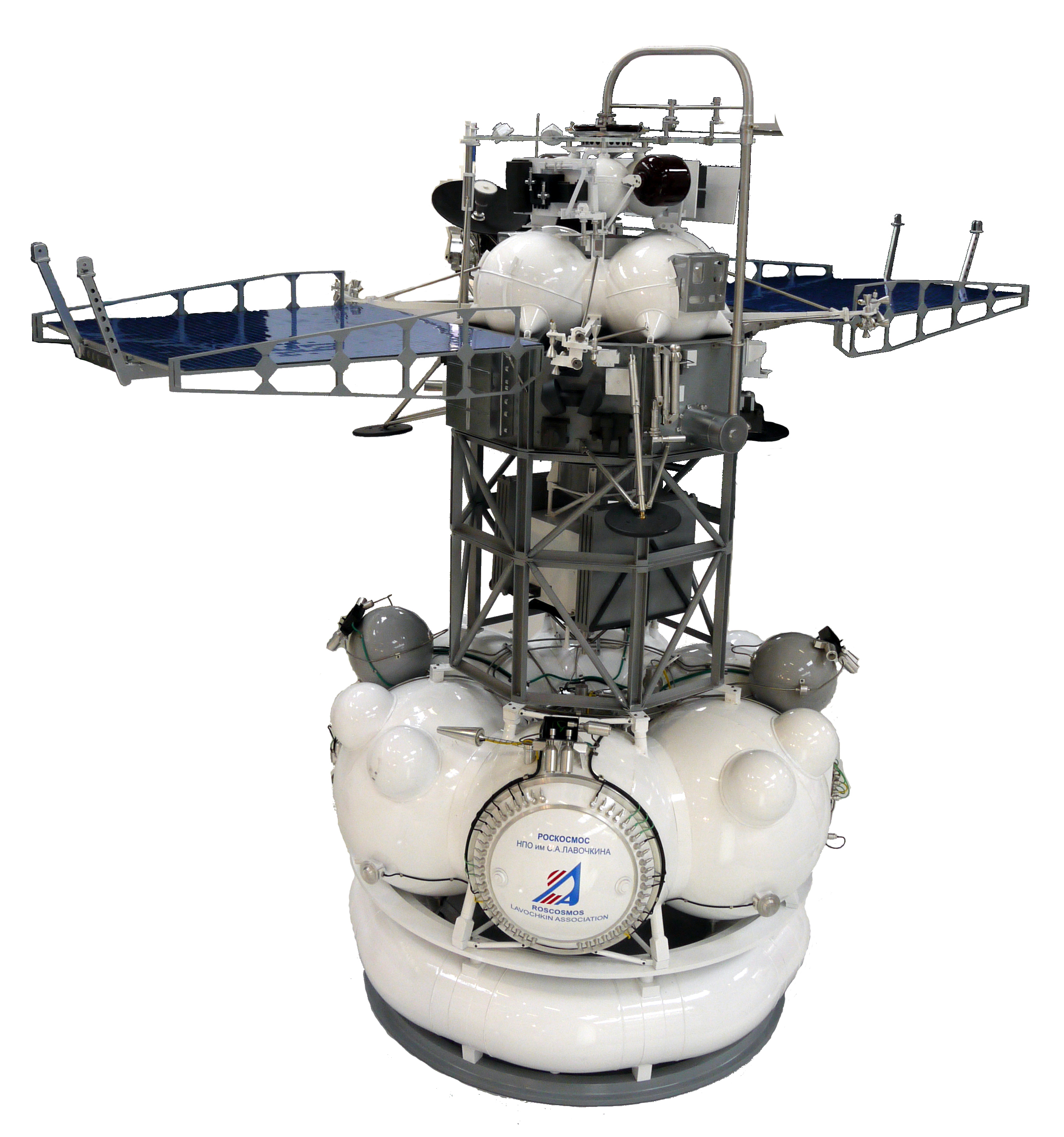
- Names: Phobos-Grunt; Фобос-Грунт
- Mission type: Phobos lander Sample return
- Operator: Roscosmos
- COSPAR ID: 2011-065A
- SATCAT no.: 37872
- Mission duration: 3 years (planned); Failed in Earth orbit

Spacecraft properties
- Manufacturer: Lavochkin, Russian Space Research Institute
- Launch mass: 13,505 kg (29,773 lb)
- Dry mass: 2,300 kg (5,100 lb)
- Power: 1 kW (main orbiter/lander) + 300 W (Earth return vehicle)

Start of mission
- Launch date: 8 November 2011, 20:16:02 UTC
- Rocket: Zenit-2SB41
- Launch site: Baikonur Cosmodrome, Site 45/1
- Contractor: Yuzhmash
- Entered service: Failed on orbit

End of mission
- Last contact: 24 November 2011
- Decay date: 15 January 2012, 17:46 UTC

Orbital parameters
- Reference system: Geocentric orbit
- Regime: Low Earth orbit
- Perigee altitude: 207 km (129 mi)
- Apogee altitude: 342 km (213 mi)
- Inclination: 51.43°
- Period: 90.0 minutes
Instruments
- GAP: Soil molecular composition analysis
- MDGF: Gamma-ray spectrometer
- MAIN: Neutron spectrometer
- Lazma: Mass spectrometer flight time
- MANAGA: Mass spectrometer
- THERMOFOB: Thermic probe
- RLR: Radar
- Seismo-1: Seismometer
- MIMOS: Mössbauer spectrometer
- METEOR-F: Micrometeoroids detector
- DIAMOND: Dust detector
- FPMS: Plasma analysis
- AOST: Fourier-transform infrared spectrometer
- TIMM-2: Solar occultation spectrometer
- MicrOmega: Spectral microscope
- TSNG: Cameras

Fobos-Grunt or Phobos-Grunt (Russian: Фобос-Грунт, lit. 'Phobos-soil') was an attempted Russian sample return mission to Phobos, one of the moons of Mars. Fobos-Grunt also carried the Chinese Mars orbiter Yinghuo-1 and the tiny Living Interplanetary Flight Experiment funded by the Planetary Society.

It was launched on 8 November 2011, at 20:16 UTC, from the Baikonur Cosmodrome, but subsequent rocket burns intended to set the craft on a course for Mars failed, leaving it stranded in low Earth orbit. Efforts to reactivate the craft were unsuccessful, and it fell back to Earth in an uncontrolled re-entry on 15 January 2012, over the Pacific Ocean, west of Chile. The return vehicle was to have returned to Earth in August 2014, carrying up to 200 g (7.1 oz) of soil from Phobos.

Funded by the Russian Federal Space Agency and developed by Lavochkin and the Russian Space Research Institute, Fobos-Grunt was the first Russian-led interplanetary mission since the failed Mars 96. The last successful interplanetary missions were the Soviet Vega 2 in 1985–1986, and the partially successful Phobos 2 in 1988–1989. Fobos-Grunt was designed to become the first spacecraft to return a macroscopic sample from an extraterrestrial body since Luna 24 in 1976.

== Project history ==
=== Budget ===
The cost of the project was 1.5 billion rubles (US$64.4 million). Project funding for the timeframe 2009–2012, including post-launch operations, was about 2.4 billion rubles. The total cost of the mission was to have been 5 billion rubles (US$163 million).

According to lead scientist Alexander Zakharov, the entire spacecraft and most of the instruments were new, though the designs drew upon the nation's legacy of three successful Luna missions, which in the 1970s retrieved a few hundred grams of Moon rocks. Zakharov had described the Phobos sample return project as "possibly the most difficult interplanetary one to date".

=== Development ===
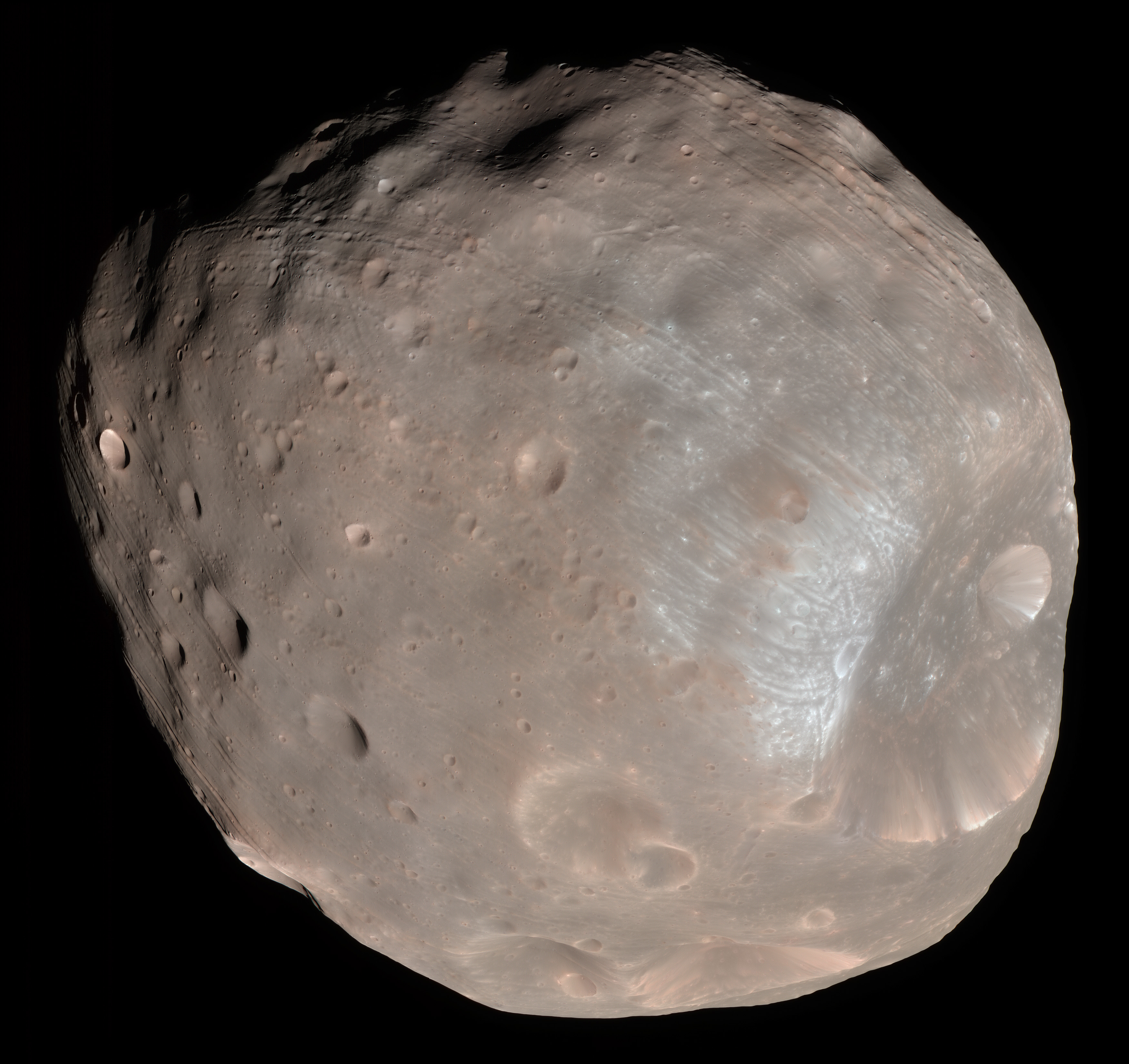
Image of Phobos. The Fobos-Grunt project began with the feasibility study of a Phobos sample-return mission in 1999.

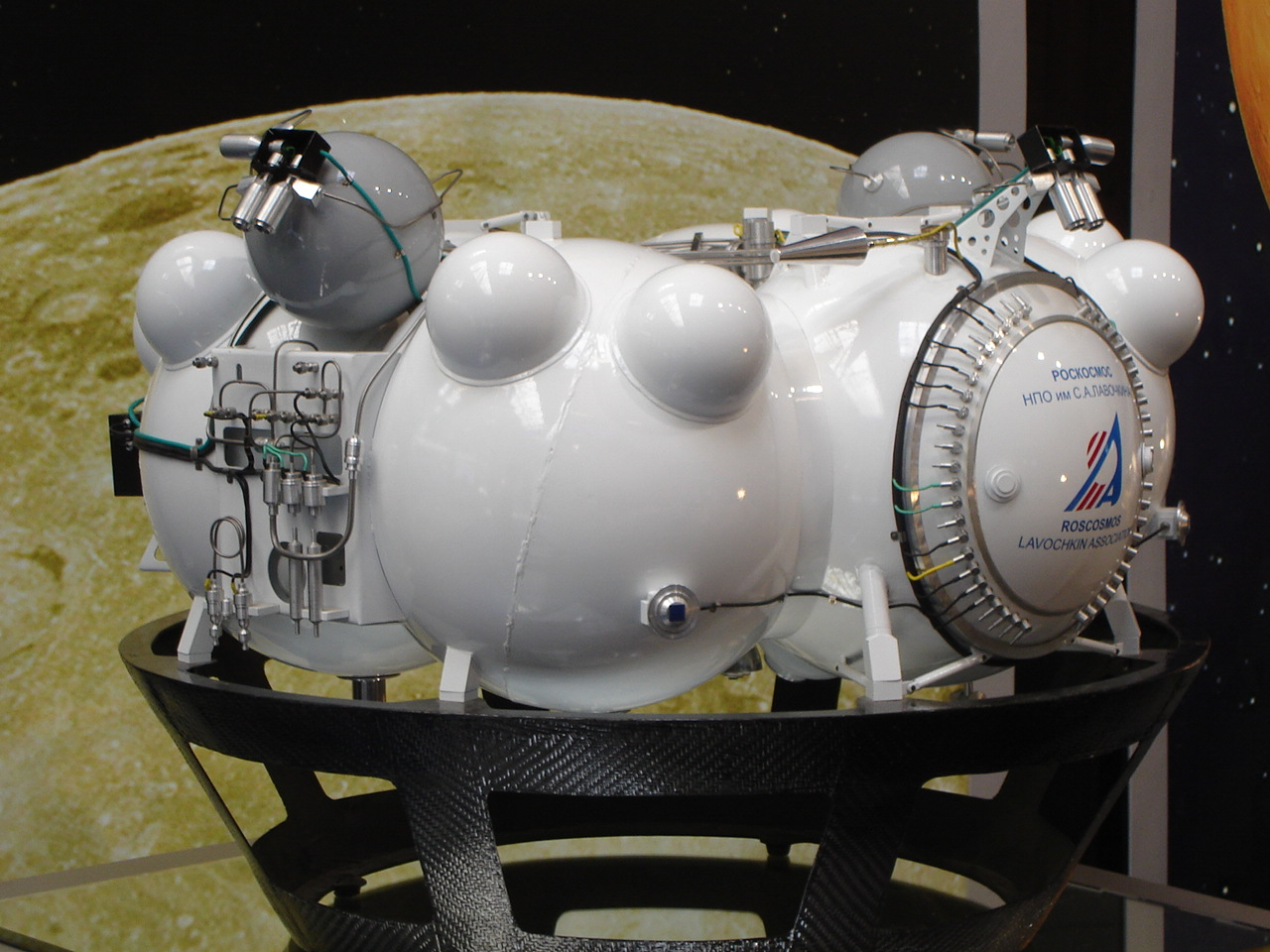
Mockup of the spacecraft's main propulsion unit

The Fobos-Grunt project began in 1999, when the Russian Space Research Institute and NPO Lavochkin, the main developer of Soviet and Russian interplanetary probes, initiated a 9 million rouble feasibility study into a Phobos sample-return mission. The initial spacecraft design was to be similar to the probes of the Phobos program launched in the late 1980s. Development of the spacecraft started in 2001 and the preliminary design was completed in 2004. For years, the project stalled as a result of low levels of financing of the Russian space program. This changed in the summer of 2005, when the new government plan for space activities in 2006–2015 was published. Fobos-Grunt was now made one of the program's flagship missions. With substantially improved funding, the launch date was set for October 2009. The 2004 design was revised a couple of times and international partners were invited to join the project. In June 2006, NPO Lavochkin announced that it had begun manufacturing and testing the development version of the spacecraft's onboard equipment.

On 26 March 2007, Russia and China signed a cooperative agreement on the joint exploration of Mars, which included sending China's first interplanetary probe, Yinghuo-1, to Mars together with the Fobos-Grunt spacecraft. Yinghuo-1 weighed 115 kg (254 lb) and would have been released by the main spacecraft into a Mars orbit.

=== Partners ===
NPO Lavochkin was the project's main contractor developing its components. The Chief Designer of Fobos-Grunt was Maksim Martynov. Phobos soil sampling and downloading were developed by the GEOHI RAN Institute of the Russian Academy of Sciences (Vernadski Institute of Geochemistry and Analytical chemistry) and the integrated scientific studies of Phobos and Mars by remote and contact methods were the responsibility of the Russian Space Research Institute, where Alexander Zakharov served as lead scientist of the mission.

The Chinese Yinghuo-1 orbiter was launched together with Fobos-Grunt. In late 2012, after a 10–11.5-month cruise, Yinghuo-1 would have separated and entered an 800 × 80,000 km equatorial orbit (5° inclination) with a period of three days. The spacecraft was expected to remain on Martian orbit for one year. Yinghuo-1 would have focused mainly on the study of the external environment of Mars. Space center researchers expected to use photographs and data to study the magnetic field of Mars and the interaction between ionospheres, escape particles and solar wind.

A second Chinese payload, the Soil Offloading and Preparation System (SOPSYS), was integrated in the lander. SOPSYS was a microgravity grinding tool developed by the Hong Kong Polytechnic University.

Another payload on Fobos-Grunt was an experiment from the Planetary Society called Living Interplanetary Flight Experiment; its goal was to test whether selected organisms can survive a few years in deep space by flying them through interplanetary space. The experiment would have tested one aspect of transpermia, the hypothesis that life could survive space travel, if protected inside rocks blasted by impact off one planet to land on another.

The Bulgarian Academy of Sciences contributed with a radiation measurement experiment on Fobos-Grunt.

Two MetNet Mars landers developed by the Finnish Meteorological Institute, were planned to be included as payload of the Fobos-Grunt mission, but weight constraints on the spacecraft required dropping the MetNet landers from the mission.

=== Postponed 2009 launch ===
The October 2009 launch date could not be achieved due to delays in the spacecraft development. During 2009, officials admitted that the schedule was very tight, but still hoped until the last moment that a launch could be made. On 21 September 2009, the mission was officially announced to be delayed until the next launch window in 2011. A main reason for the delay was difficulties encountered during development of the spacecraft's onboard computers. While the Moscow-based company Tehkhom provided the computer hardware on time, the internal NPO Lavochkin team responsible for integration and software development fell behind schedule. The retirement of NPO Lavochkin's head Valeriy N. Poletskiy in January 2010 was widely seen as linked to the delay of Fobos-Grunt. Viktor Khartov was appointed the new head of the company. During the extra development time resulting from the delay, a Polish-built drill was added to the Phobos lander as a back-up soil extraction device.

=== 2011 launch ===
The spacecraft arrived at Baikonur Cosmodrome on 17 October 2011 and was transported to Site 31 for pre-launch processing. The Zenit-2SB41 launch vehicle carrying Fobos-Grunt successfully lifted off from Baikonur Cosmodrome at 20:16 UTC on 8 November 2011. The Zenit booster inserted the spacecraft into an initial 207 km × 347 km (129 mi × 216 mi) elliptical low Earth orbit with an inclination of 51.4°.

Two firings of the main propulsion unit in Earth orbit were required to send the spacecraft onto the interplanetary trajectory. Since both engine ignitions would have taken place outside the range of Russian ground stations, the project participants asked volunteers around the world to take optical observations of the burns, e.g. with telescopes, and report the results to enable more accurate prediction of the mission flight path upon entry into the range of Russian ground stations.

=== Post-launch ===
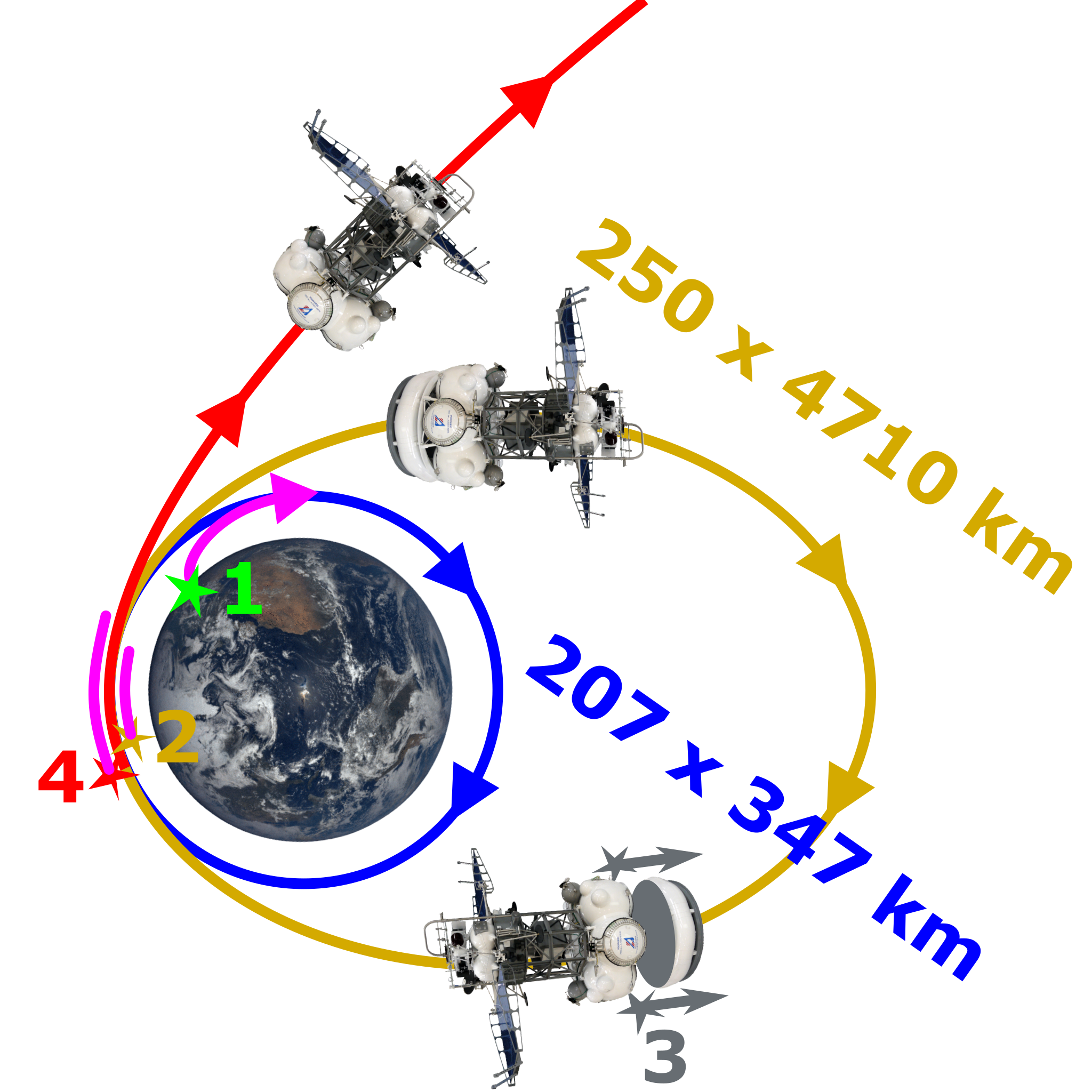
Overview of planned trajectories.: 1. Baikonour launch; 2. First Burn; 3. Spent fuel tank ejected; 4. Second Burn (Departure to Martian system)

It was expected that after 2.5 hours and 1.7 revolutions in the initial orbit, the autonomous main propulsion unit (MDU), derived from the Fregat upper stage, would conduct its firing to insert the spacecraft into the elliptical orbit (250 km x 4150–4170 km) with a period of about 2.2 hours. After the completion of the first burn, the external fuel tank of the propulsion unit was expected to be jettisoned, with ignition for a second burn to depart Earth orbit scheduled for one orbit, or 2.1 hours, after the end of the first burn. The propulsion module constitutes the cruise-stage bus of Fobos-Grunt. According to original plans, Mars orbit arrival had been expected during September 2012 and the return vehicle was scheduled to reach Earth in August 2014.

Following what would have been the planned end of the first burn, the spacecraft could not be located in the target orbit. The spacecraft was subsequently discovered to still be in its initial parking orbit and it was determined that the burn had not taken place. Initially, engineers had about three days from launch to rescue the spacecraft before its batteries ran out. It was then established that the craft's solar panels had deployed, giving engineers more time to restore control. It was soon discovered the spacecraft was adjusting its orbit, changing its expected re-entry from late November or December 2011 to as late as early 2012. Even though it had not been contacted, the spacecraft seemed to be actively adjusting its perigee (the point it is closest to Earth in its orbit).

=== Contact ===
On 22 November 2011, a signal from the probe was picked up by the European Space Agency's tracking station in Perth, Australia, after it had sent the probe the command to turn on one of its transmitters. The European Space Operations Centre (ESOC) in Darmstadt, Germany, reported that the contact was made at 20:25 UTC on 22 November 2011 after some modifications had been made to the 15 metres (49 ft) dish facility in Perth to improve its chances of getting a signal. No telemetry was received in this communication. It remained unclear whether the communications link would have been sufficient to command the spacecraft to switch on its engines to take it on its intended trajectory toward Mars. Roscosmos officials said that the window of opportunity to salvage Fobos-Grunt would close in early December 2011.

The next day, on 23 November 2011, the Perth station again made contact with the spacecraft and during 6 minutes, about 400 telemetry "frames" and Doppler information were received. The amount of information received during this communication was not sufficient, and therefore it was not possible to identify the problem with the probe. Further communication attempts made by ESA were unsuccessful and contact was not reestablished. The space vehicle did not respond to the commands sent by the European Space Agency to raise its orbit. Roscosmos provided these commands to ESA.

From Baikonour, Kazakhstan, Roscosmos was able to receive telemetry from Fobos-Grunt on 24 November 2011 but attempts to contact it failed. This telemetry demonstrated that the probe's radio equipment was working and that it was communicating with the spacecraft's flight control systems. Moreover, Roscosmos's top officials believed Fobos-Grunt to be functional, stably oriented and charging batteries through its solar panels.

In a late November 2011 interview, the service manager of the European Space Agency for Fobos-Grunt, Wolfgang Hell, stated that Roscosmos had a better understanding of the problem with the spacecraft, saying they reached the conclusion that they have some kind of power problem on board.

ESA failed to communicate with the space probe in all of the five opportunities the agency had between 28 and 29 November 2011. During those occasions, the spacecraft did not comply with orders to fire the engines and raise its orbit. The Russian space agency then requested that ESA repeat the orders. The European Space Agency decided to end the efforts to contact the probe on 2 December 2011, with one analyst saying that Fobos-Grunt appeared "dead in the water". However, ESA made teams available to assist the Fobos-Grunt mission if there was a change in situation. In spite of that, Roscosmos stated its intention to continue to try to contact the space vehicle until it entered the atmosphere.

The U.S. Strategic Command's Joint Space Operations Center (JSpOC) tracked the probe and identified at the start of December 2011 that Fobos-Grunt had an elliptical Earth orbit at an altitude of between 209 km (130 mi) and 305 km (190 mi), but falling a few kilometers each day.

=== Re-entry ===
Before reentry, the spacecraft still carried about 7.51 tonnes of highly toxic hydrazine and nitrogen tetroxide on board. This was mostly fuel for the spacecraft's upper stage. These compounds, with melting points of 2 °C and −11.2 °C, are normally kept in liquid form and were expected to burn out during re-entry. NASA veteran James Oberg said the hydrazine and nitrogen tetroxide "could freeze before ultimately entering", thus contaminating the impact area. He also stated that if Fobos-Grunt were not salvaged, it may be the most dangerous object to fall from orbit. Meanwhile, the head of Roscosmos said the probability of parts reaching the Earth surface was "highly unlikely" and that the spacecraft, including the LIFE module and the Yinghuo-1 orbiter, would be destroyed during re-entry.

Russian military sources claimed that Fobos-Grunt was somewhere over the Pacific Ocean between New Zealand and South America when it re-entered the atmosphere at about 17:45 UTC. Although it was initially feared its remains would reach land as close as 145 kilometres (90 mi) west of Santa Fe, Argentina, the Russian military Air and Space Defense Forces reported that it ultimately fell into the Pacific Ocean, 1,247 km (775 mi) west of Wellington Island, Chile. The Defence Ministry spokesman subsequently revealed that such estimate was based on calculations, without witness reports. In contrast, Russian civilian ballistic experts said that the fragments had fallen over a broader patch of Earth's surface, and that the midpoint of the crash zone was located in the Goiás state of Brazil.

=== Aftermath ===
Initially, the head of Roscosmos Vladimir Popovkin, suggested that the Fobos-Grunt failure might have been the result of sabotage by a foreign nation. He also stated that risky technical decisions had been made because of limited funding. On 17 January 2012, an unidentified Russian official speculated that a U.S. radar stationed on the Marshall Islands may have inadvertently disabled the probe, but cited no evidence. Popovkin suggested the microchips may have been counterfeit, then he announced on 1 February 2012 that a burst of cosmic radiation may have caused computers to reboot and go into a standby mode. Industry experts cast doubt on the claim citing how unlikely the effects of such a burst are in low Earth orbit, inside the protection of Earth's magnetic field.

On 6 February 2012, the commission investigating the mishap concluded that Fobos-Grunt mission failed because of "a programming error which led to a simultaneous reboot of two working channels of an onboard computer". The craft's rocket pack never fired due to the computer reboot, leaving the craft stranded in Earth orbit. Although the specific failure was identified, experts suggest it was the culmination of poor quality control, lack of testing, security issues and corruption. Russian president Dmitry Medvedev suggested that those responsible should be punished and perhaps criminally prosecuted.

=== Repeat mission ===
In January 2012, scientists and engineers at the Russian Space Research Institute and NPO Lavochkin called for a repeat sample return mission called Fobos-Grunt-2 and Boomerang for launch in 2020. Popovkin declared that they would soon attempt to repeat the Fobos-Grunt mission, if an agreement was not reached for Russian co-operation in the European Space Agency's ExoMars program. However, since an agreement was reached for the inclusion of Russia as a full project partner, some instruments originally developed for Fobos-Grunt were flown in the ExoMars Trace Gas Orbiter.

On 2 August 2014, the Russian Academy of Sciences stated that the Phobos-Grunt repeat mission might be restarted for a launch approximately in 2024. In August 2015, the ESA-Roscosmos working group on post-ExoMars cooperation, completed a joint study for a possible future Phobos sample return mission, preliminary discussions were held, and in May 2015 the Russian Academy of Sciences submitted a budget proposal.

As of September 2023, Roscosmos intended to launch Boomerang "after 2030".

Boomerang is intended to be the first stage of the Russian Mars sample return mission called Mars-Grunt. This Mars sample-return mission would be developed from the technologies demonstrated by Fobos-Grunt-2.

== Objectives ==
Fobos-Grunt was an intended interplanetary probe that included a lander to study Phobos and a sample return vehicle to return a sample of about 200 g (7.1 oz) of soil to Earth. It was also to study Mars from orbit, including its atmosphere and dust storms, plasma and radiation.

Science goals

- Delivery of samples of Phobos soil to Earth for scientific research of Phobos, Mars and Martian vicinity;
- In situ and remote studies of Phobos (to include analysis of soil samples);
- Monitoring the atmospheric behavior of Mars, including the dynamics of dust storms;
- Studies of the vicinity of Mars, including its radiation environment, plasma and dust;
- Study of the origin of the Martian moons and their relation to Mars;
- Study of the role played by asteroid impacts in the formation of terrestrial planets;
- Search for possible past or present life (biosignatures);
- Study of the impact of a three-year interplanetary round-trip journey on extremophile microorganisms in a small sealed capsule (LIFE experiment).

== Payload ==
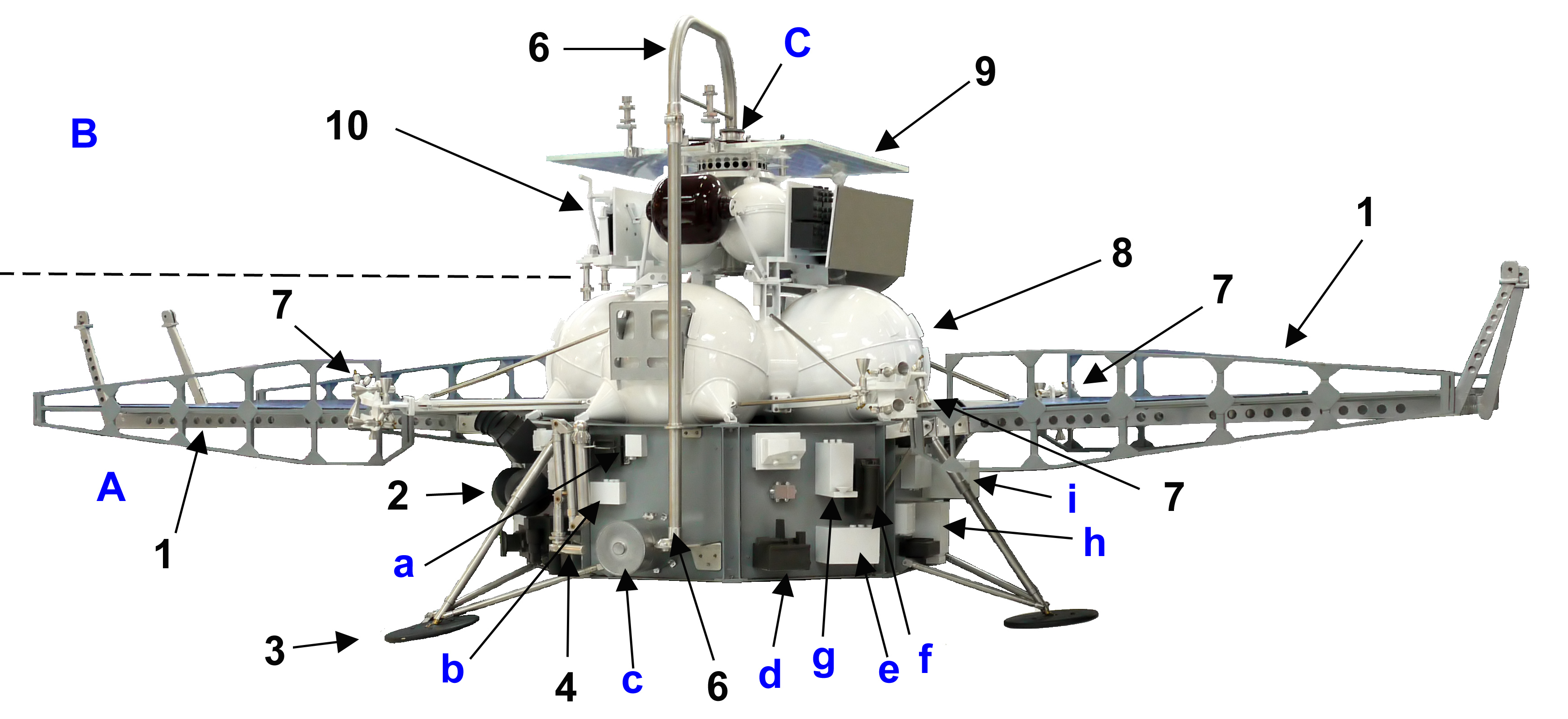
Modules -- A: lander, B: return module, C: reentry vehicle (not shown). Major components -- 1: solar panels, 2: reaction wheels, 3: landing gear, 4: robotic sample arm (second arm not shown), 6: sample transfer container, 7: attitude control thrusters, 8 and 10: fuel and helium tanks, 9: return module solar panels. Scientific instruments (some instruments are not visible from this angle or are not present on the model) -- a: TERMOFOB thermodetector, b: GRAS-F seismogravimeter; c: Meteor-F cosmic dust detector, d: GAP (Gas Analytic Package) pyrolizer/thermal-differential analyzer, e: GAP gas chromatograph; f: GAP mass spectrometer, g: LAZMA mass spectrometer, h: MANAGA-F mass spectrometer, i: FPMS plasma complex

- TV system for navigation and guidance (TSNN)
- Stereo camera pair
- Manipulator 1, with:
  - Panoramic camera
  - MicrOmega visible microscope
  - Mössbauer Spectrometer (MIMOS-II)
  - Drill sampler (GZU)
- Manipulator 2, with:
  - Panoramic camera 2
  - Drill sampler (GZU 2)
  - Penetration sampler (GZUP Chomik)
- MicrOmega near-infrared microscope
- Gas Analysis Package:
  - SOil Preparation SYStem (SOPSYS)
  - Thermal Differential Analyzer (TDA)
  - Gas-Chromatograph (KhMS-1F)
  - Mass-Spectrometer (MAL-1F)
- Gamma ray spectrometer (FOGS)
- Neutron & γ-ray spectrometer (NS HEND)
- Laser Time-of-Flight Mass Spectrometer (LAZMA)
- Thermal Detector (TERMOFOB)
- Fourier Spectrometer (AOST)
- Echelle Spectrometer (TIMM-2)
- Seismogravimeter (GRAS-F)
- Seismometer (SEISMO)
- Long-wave radar (DPR)
- Dust counter (Meteor-F)
- Dosimeter (Liulin-F)
- Secondary Ion Mass Spectrometer (MANAGA-F)
- Optical solar & star sensor (LIBRATsIYa)
- Plasma Complex (FPMS)
  - Fluxgate magnetometer (DFM)
  - Inductive magnetic sensor (KVD)
  - Ion mass spectrometer (DIM)
  - Ion mass spectrometer (DI)
- Ultrastable Oscillator (USO1)
- Ionospheric parameters radio occultation experiment together with Yinghuo-1 (YH-1) spacecraft (MROE)
- BioPhobos/Anabiosis
- BioPhobos/LIFE (Living Interplanetary Flight Experiment)

=== Mass summary ===
Spacecraft components	Mass
Lander sample capsule	7 kg (15 lb)
Earth return vehicle (tot.):	287 kg (633 lb)
-Propellant (for trans-Earth injection maneuvers)	139 kg (306 lb)
-Dry mass	148 kg (326 lb)
Orbiter/lander instrument compartment	550 kg (1,210 lb)
Orbiter/lander (tot.):	1,270 kg (2,800 lb)
-Propellant (for Phobos rendezvous and landing)	1,058 kg (2,332 lb)
-Dry mass	212 kg (467 lb)
Phobos-Grunt/Yinghuo/MPU truss adapter	150 kg (330 lb)
"Yinghuo 1" subsatellite	115 kg (254 lb)
Main propulsion unit (MPU) stage, excluding external propellant tank:	7,750 kg (17,090 lb)
-Propellant (for trans-Mars injection burn and initial 800 km × 75,900 km (500 mi × 47,160 mi) Mars orbit insertion)	7,015 kg (15,465 lb)
-Dry mass	735 kg (1,620 lb)
External propellant tank:	3,376 kg (7,443 lb)
-Propellant (for 250 km × 4,710 km (160 mi × 2,930 mi) Earth parking orbit insertion)	3,001 kg (6,616 lb)
-Dry mass	375 kg (827 lb)
Total mass	13,505 kg (29,773 lb)

== Mission plan ==
=== Journey ===
The spacecraft's journey to Mars would take about ten months. After arriving in Mars orbit, the main propulsion unit and the transfer truss would separate and the Chinese Mars orbiter would be released. Fobos-Grunt would then spend several months studying the planet and its moons from orbit, before landing on Phobos. It was imperative to prevent the introduction to Mars of contaminants from Earth; according to Fobos-Grunt Chief Designer Maksim Martynov, the probability of the probe accidentally reaching the surface of Mars was much lower than the maximum specified for Category III missions, the type assigned to Fobos-Grunt and defined in COSPAR's planetary protection policy (in accordance with Article IX of the Outer Space Treaty).

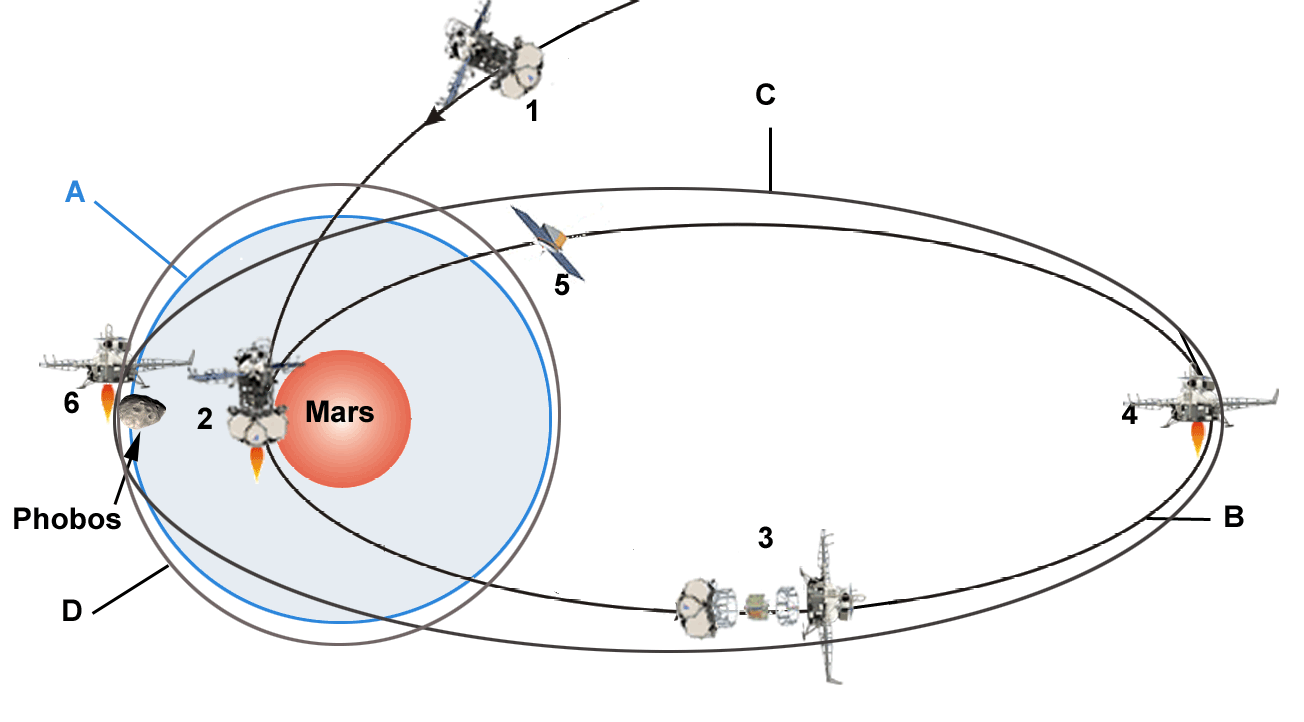
Phobos-Grunt around Mars: (1) Arrival of Phobos-Grunt, (2) Insertion maneuver in orbit around Mars, (3) Drop of the Fregat stage and separation of the probe and Yinghuo-1, (4) Maneuver for to raise the periapsis, (5) Yinghuo 1 starts his mission on the first orbit, (6) Maneuver to place himself in an orbit close to that of Phobos; (A) Orbit of Phobos, (B) Orbit of insertion of Phobos-Grunt and Yinghuo-1, (C) Orbit with raised periapsis, (D) Quasi-synchronous orbit with Phobos.

=== On Phobos ===
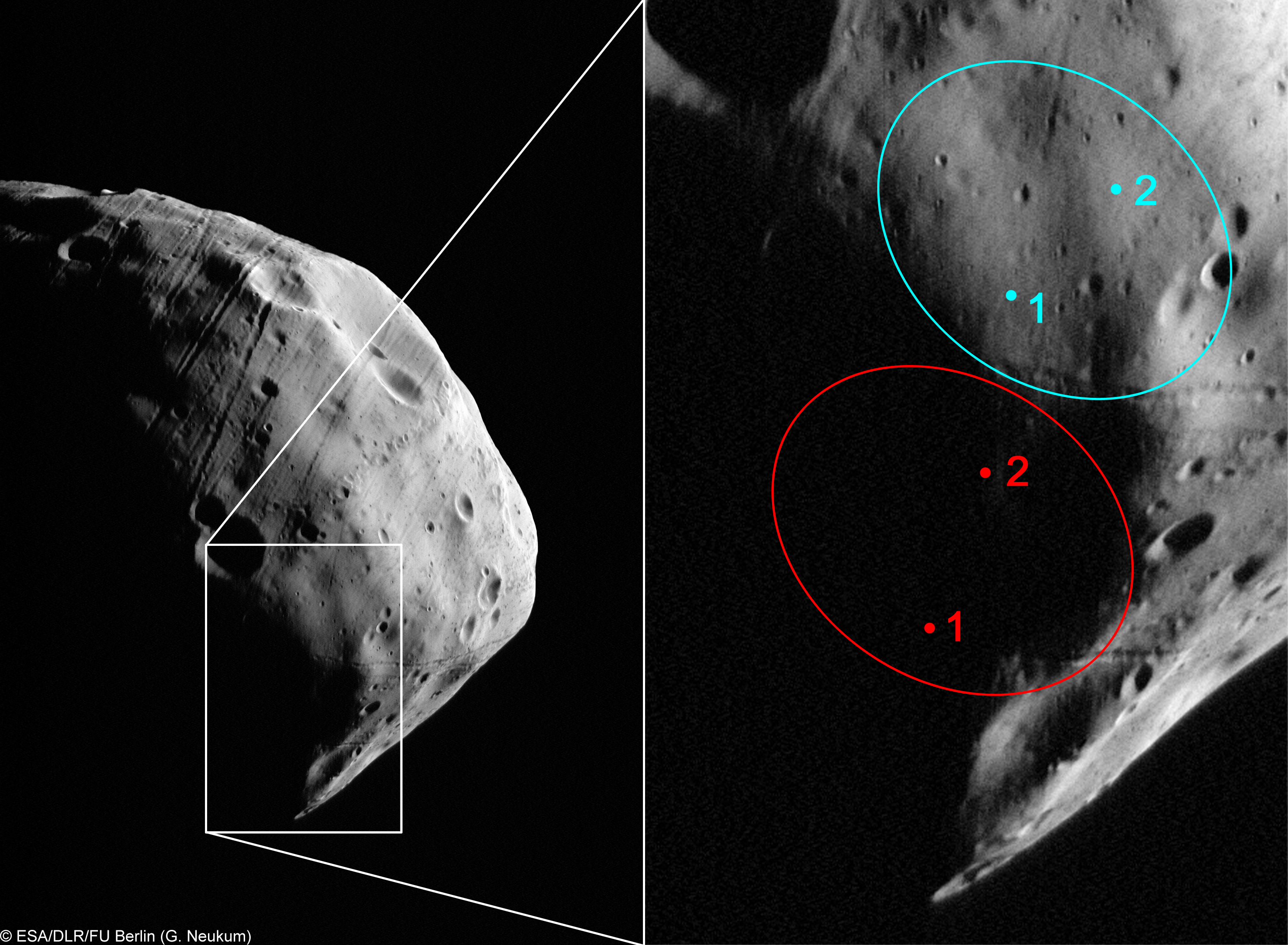
Proposed landing sites, photo by Mars Express

The planned landing site at Phobos was a region from 5°S to 5°N, 230° to 235°E. Soil sample collection would begin immediately after the lander touched down on Phobos, with collection lasting 2–7 days. An emergency mode existed for the case of communications breakdown, which enabled the lander to automatically launch the return rocket to deliver the samples to Earth.

A robotic arm would have collected samples up to 1.3 cm (0.51 in) in diameter. At the end of the arm was a pipe-shaped tool which split to form a claw. The tool contained a piston which would have pushed the sample into a cylindrical container. A light-sensitive photo-diode would have confirmed whether material collection was successful and also allowed visual inspection of the digging area. The sample extraction device would have performed 15 to 20 scoops yielding a total of 85 to 156 g (3.0 to 5.5 oz) of soil. The samples would be loaded into a capsule which would then be moved inside a special pipeline into the descent module by inflating an elastic bag within the pipe with gas. Because the characteristics of Phobos soil are uncertain, the lander included another soil-extraction device, a Polish-built drill, which would have been used in case the soil turned out to be too rocky for the main scooping device.

After the departure of the return stage, the lander's experiments would have continued in situ on Phobos's surface for a year. To conserve power, mission control would have turned these on and off in a precise sequence. The robotic arm would have placed more samples in a chamber that would heat it and analyze its emission spectra. This analysis might have been able to determine the presence of volatile compounds, such as water.

=== Sample return to Earth ===
The return stage was mounted on top of the lander. It would have needed to accelerate to 35 km/h (22 mph) to escape Phobos's gravity. In order to avoid harming the experiments remaining at the lander, the return stage would have ignited its engine once the vehicle had been vaulted to a safe height by springs. It would then have begun maneuvers for the eventual trip to Earth, where it would have arrived in August 2014. An 11-kg descent vehicle containing the capsule with soil samples (up to 0.2 kg (0.44 lb)) would have been released on direct approach to Earth at 12 km/s (7.5 mi/s). Following the aerodynamic braking to 30 m/s (98 ft/s) the conical descent vehicle would perform a hard landing without a parachute within the Sary Shagan test range in Kazakhstan. The vehicle did not have any radio equipment. Ground-based radar and optical observations would have been used to track the vehicle's return.

=== Summary of intended mission phases ===
Event	Date	Notes
Departure from Earth orbit	28 October – 21 November 2011	Three course corrections of up to 130 m/s delta V foreseen during Earth-Mars cruise
Mars arrival	25 August – 26 September 2012	945 m/s braking burn to enter initial Mars parting orbit with periapsis = 800 ± 400 km, apoapsis = 79,000 km and period of three days. Propulsion module and Yinghuo-1 separates from the rest of the craft.
Transfer to intermediate Mars orbit	October – December 2012	220 m/s engine burn to raise periapsis to 6499 km, changing the orbital period to 3.3 days and the orbital inclination to that of Phobos.
Transfer to Phobos observation orbit	December 2012	705 m/s engine burn to insert the craft into an early circular orbit with an average radius of 9910 km, i.e. about 535 km above Phobos orbit, and orbital period = 8.3 h.
Rendezvous with Phobos	January 2013	45 m/s + 20 m/s engine burns for transfer to quasi-synchronous orbit where the probe always remains within 50..140 km of Phobos.
Phobos landing and surface activities	End of January – beginning of April 2013	Landing maneuver takes two hours (100 m/s delta V trajectory changes).
Separation of Earth return vehicle (ERV) from lander	April 2013	10 m/s + 20 m/s trajectory change to enter parking orbit 300–350 km lower than Phobos with a period of 7.23 hours.
ERV transfer orbit	Starting in August 2013	740 m/s periapsis burn for insertion into 3-day elliptical transfer orbit.
ERV pre orbit insertion	Mid-August 2013	125 m/s burn to change the inclination of the orbit while decreasing the periapsis distance to 500–1000 km above the martian surface.
ERV trans-Earth injection burn	3–23 September 2013	Final 790 m/s engine burn to accelerate out of Mars orbit.
ERV Earth arrival	15–18 August 2014	Up to five trajectory corrections (combined delta V < 130 m/s) would be performed before atmospheric entry.

=== Ground control ===
The mission control center was located at the Center for Deep Space Communications (Национальный центр управления и испытаний космических средств (in Russian), equipped with RT-70 radio telescope near Yevpatoria in Crimea. Russia and Ukraine agreed in late October 2010 that the European Space Operations Centre in Darmstadt, Germany, would have controlled the probe.

Communications with the spacecraft on the initial parking orbit are described in a two-volume publication.

== Scientific critiques ==
Barry E. DiGregorio, Director of the International Committee Against Mars Sample Return (ICAMSR), criticised the LIFE experiment carried by Fobos-Grunt as a violation of the Outer Space Treaty due to the possibility of contamination of Phobos or Mars with the microbial spores and live bacteria it contains should it have lost control and crash-landed on either body. It is speculated that the heat-resistant extremophile bacteria could survive such a crash, on the basis that Microbispora bacteria survived the Space Shuttle Columbia disaster.

According to Fobos-Grunt Chief Designer Maksim Martynov, the probability of the probe accidentally reaching the surface of Mars was much lower than the maximum specified for Category III missions, the type assigned to Fobos-Grunt and defined in COSPAR's planetary protection policy (in accordance with Article IX of the Outer Space Treaty).

== See also ==
- List of missions to Mars
- Mars sample return mission – Mars mission to collect rock and dust samples
- Phobos program – 1988 Soviet missions to Mars
- Martian Moons eXploration – Japanese sample-return mission to Phobos
