= Andrey Movchan =

Russian Cypriot financier

- Андрей Андреевич Мовча́н
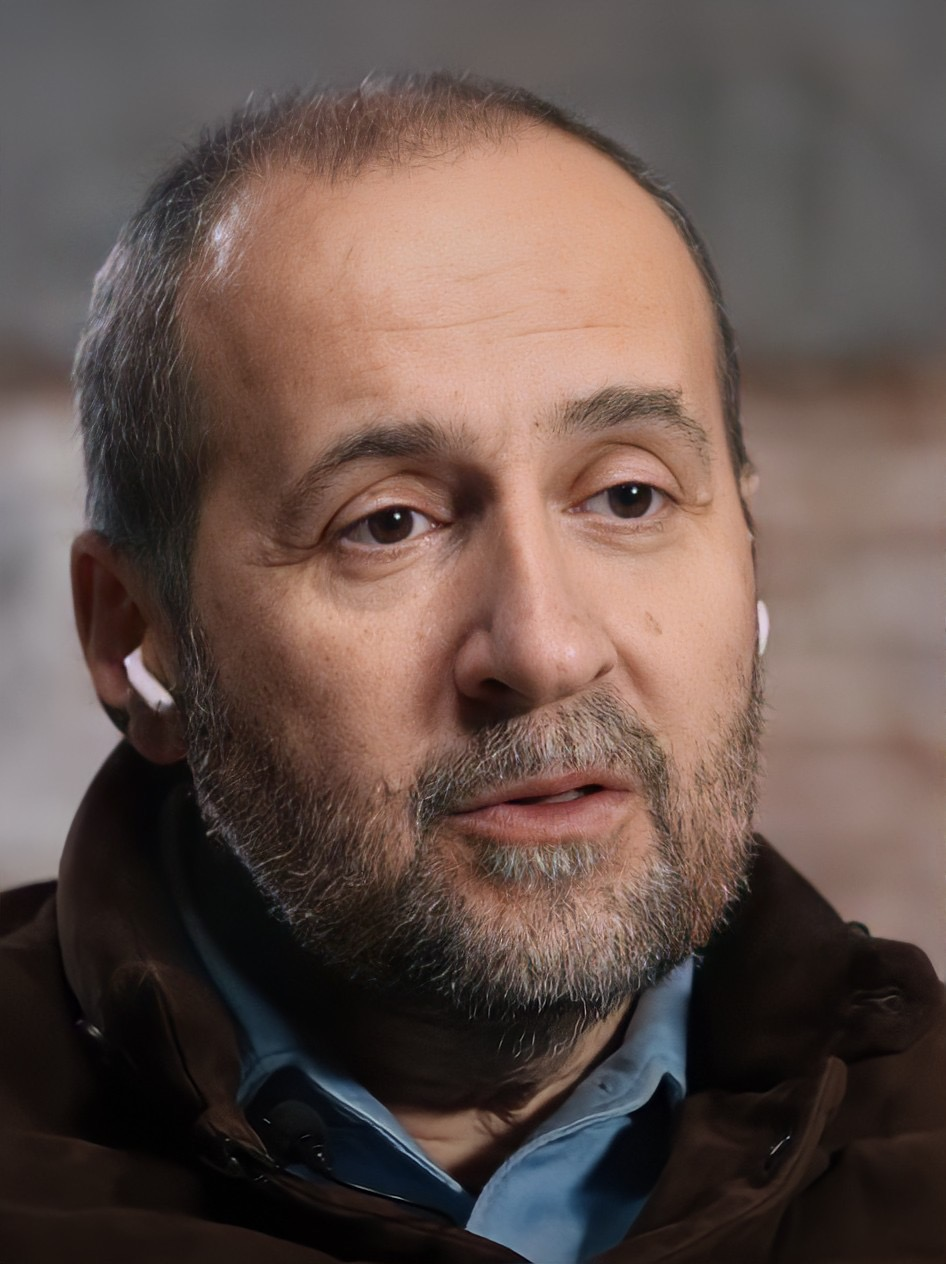
- Born: Andrey Andreevich Movchan; April 25, 1968 (age 57); Moscow, USSR
- Citizenship: Cyprus, Israel
- Occupations: Financier, Investor
- Website: movchansgroup.com

Andrey Movchan (born 25 April 1968, Moscow, USSR) is a Russian-born Cypriot financier and investment specialist. He is the founder of Movchan's Group, a group of investment management companies, formerly a director and currently an expert in the Economic Policy Programme at the Carnegie Moscow Centre.

== Early life and education ==
Movchan attended the Physics and Mathematics school no. 444 from 1975 and went on to study at the Moscow State University between 1985 and 1992 and then the Financial University under the Government of the Russian Federation until 1996. He completed an MBA at the University of Chicago Booth School of Business in 2003.

== Career ==
- 1993-1994 - Head of department, Alfa Group.
- 1994-1995 - Deputy Chairman of the management board of Guta Financial Group.
- 1995-1997 Head of Department at Rossiyskiy Kredit Bank.
- From 1997 to 2003 - Executive Director of Troika Dialog Company.
- 2003-2009 - CEO of Renaissance Investment Management.
- 2006-2008 - CEO of Renaissance Credit Bank.
- In 2009, he founded IC ‘Third Rome’ and was CEO of the company until its sale in 2013.
- In 2015, he headed the Economic Policy Programme at the Carnegie Moscow Center, and since July 2017 he has been an expert of the programme.
- In 2016, he founded Movchan's Group, an investment management company.

== Personal life ==
He married and is the father of four children. His wife Olga is a cardiologist and Gestalt therapist.

Movchan left Russia in 2020 and moved to London with his family.

In 2023 he renounced his Russian citizenship.

== Recognition ==
- 2006 - ‘The Most Successful CEO of a Management Company in Russia’ (Forbes)
- 2006 - Person of the Year 2006 (RBC)
- 2007 - Grand Prix Chivas Top 18 Financials 2007
- 2008 - ‘Best CEO of a Management Company’ (Finance)
- 2009 - was the first in Russia to be awarded the title ‘Stock Market Legend’ by SPEARS
- 2011, 2013 - winner of the business journalism contest ‘Presscation’ in the nomination ‘Word and Deed’.

== Publications ==
He has written columns for Forbes magazine, Republic.ru, Vedomosti and RBC. He maintains a blog at Snob.ru and has appeared on the TV Rain channel and the Echo of Moscow radio station. He publishes essays on financial and economic topics in various publications.

=== Books ===
- Movchan, Andrey (2019). Russia in the Post-Truth Era: Common Sense vs Information Noise. Alpina Publishers. ISBN 978-5-9614-2428-7.
- Movchan, Andrey; Mitrov, Alexey (2020). Cursed Economies. AST Publishers. ISBN 978-5-17-109321-1.
- Movchan, Andrey (2022). An English Diary. AST Publishers. ISBN 978-5-17-135332-2.
- Movchan, Andrey (2023). From War to War. Freedom Letters. ISBN 9781998265336.
