= Maksim Martynov =

Soviet and Russian engineer

Maxim Borisovich Martynov (Russian: Максим Борисович Мартынов; born January 15, 1973) is a Soviet and Russian engineer. He currently serves as deputy general designer and the head of the bureau at the interplanetary probe developer NPO Lavochkin. He was the chief designer of the Fobos-Grunt project at the Russian aerospace company NPO Lavochkin.

== Biography ==
Martynov was born on January 15, 1973, in Moscow region.
