= Alexander Baunov =

Russian journalist

- Александр Баунов
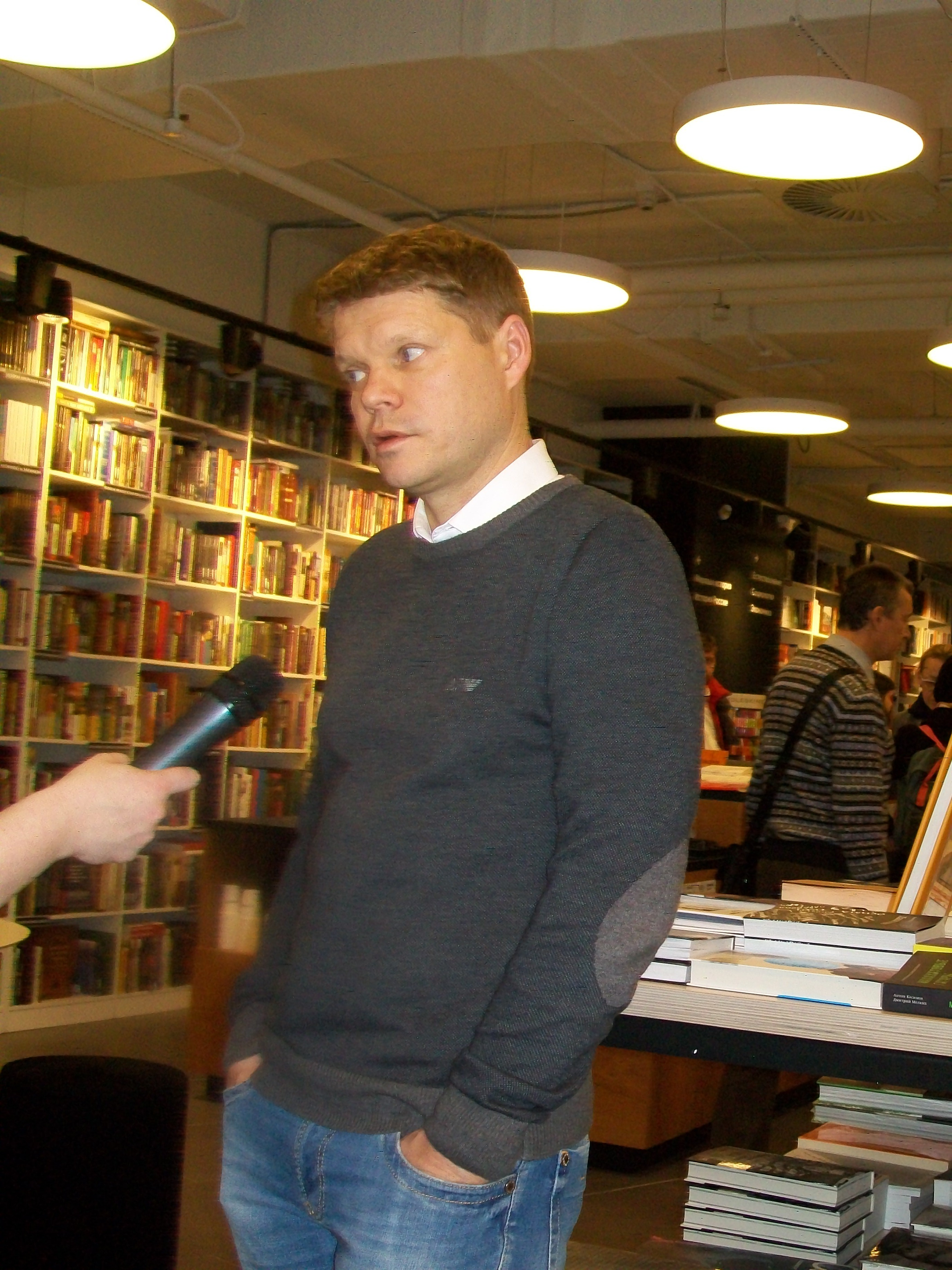
- Baunov in 2017
- Born: Alexander Germanovich Baunov; 4 December 1969 (age 56); Yaroslavl, Russian SFSR, Soviet Union
- Occupations: Journalist, philologist, diplomat, political commentator
- Aleksandr Baunov's voice From the Echo of Moscow program, 21 March 2015

Alexander Germanovich Baunov (Russian: Александр Германович Баунов, born December 4, 1969) is a Russian international policy expert, journalist, publicist, and former diplomat. Since 2015, he has been a senior associate at the Carnegie Moscow Center and later at the Carnegie Russia Eurasia Center, as well as editor in chief of Carnegie.ru and then of CarnegiePolitika.

Baunov is the author of the books WikiLeaks: Diplomacy by the Back Door, It's a Small Myth, and The End of the Regime: How Three European Dictatorships Ended (all in Russian).

In 1995 he graduated from the Department of Classical Philology of the Philological Faculty of Moscow State University Lomonosov. From 1999 to 2003, he worked in the diplomatic service of the Russian Ministry of Foreign Affairs at the Embassy in Greece. From 2004 to 2008, he worked as a reporter, and then editor in the international department of the magazine Russian Newsweek. He published a number of guidebooks on Greece and its regions. From 2009 to 2015, he was a columnist and senior editor of the daily network edition www.slon.ru. In addition to slon.ru, he published in the newspaper Vedomosti, the magazine Big City, and Russian Life. He has published articles in Foreign Policy, Foreign Affairs, and The Atlantic. He regularly comments on domestic events and foreign policy issues in leading international media sources (Reuters, Associated Press, Bloomberg, The New York Times, France Presse, Forbes, El País, etc.) Since 2015, he has been the chief editor at the Carnegie Moscow Center.

In 2013, he was a finalist for the "Politischevet" publicist prize. In 2014, he was the chairman of the selection committee for the "PolitProsvet" award.

As of 2022, Baunov was research fellow at the Institut für die Wissenschaften vom Menschen in Vienna, and in 2023 he was Visiting Fellow at the Robert Schuman Centre for Advanced Studies.

== Publications ==
- Alexander Baunov (2011). WikiLeaks: дипломатия с черного хода [WikiLeaks: Diplomacy by the back door] (in Russian). Moscow: Эксмо. p. 320. ISBN 978-5-699-48414-0..
- Alexander Baunov (2015). Миф тесен [It's a small myth] (in Russian). Moscow: Время. p. 448. ISBN 978-5-9691-1493-7..
- Alexander Baunov (2023). Конец режима. Как закончились три европейские диктатуры [The End of the Regime: How Three European Dictatorships Ended] (in Russian). Moscow: Альпина Паблишер. p. 606. ISBN 978-5-9614-8245-4..
