= Space Station Biological Research Program =

The Space Station Biological Research Program is the main project concerning life sciences research to be conducted on the International Space Station. It is a program of NASA's Ames Research Center, with co-operation from other national space agencies. The SSBRP's goal is to study the development, life cycle, and behavior of certain organisms in the environment of outer space. Reference Experiments are gathered from an international scientific community and categorized by science discipline to assist in hardware requirement definition and development.

For each studied organism, a specialized habitat device is to be constructed. These include:

- The Advanced Animal Habitat, for individually or group-housed rats and mice
- The Plant Research Unit, housing Arabidopsis thaliana and specialized wheat
- The Aquatic Habitat, for various organisms including zebrafish
- The Insect Habitat, studying fruit flies
- The Avian Development Facility, for research involving the eggs of Japanese quail
- The Cell Culture Unit, to investigate several microorganisms, as well as to grow tissue cultures from humans, animals, and plants.

Once flight-qualified, habitats (also referred to as "sub rack payloads") would be carried to the Space Station aboard a Space Shuttle (housed in the Orbiter Middeck), and transferred to a specially designed Habitat Holding Rack, which would provide them with the cooling air, power, and data connections required. On-station, the habitats could also be housed in a centrifuge module that could simulate gravity with a magnitude between zero and two times that experienced on earth. When station crew needed to add or remove specimens, or perform certain other work, a habitat would be transferred to the Life Sciences Glovebox, an enclosed volume with glove inserts in the walls to allow a crew member to perform manual tasks. Data generated by the habitats would be transmitted to ground stations for analysis.

To date, none of the SSBRP's payloads have been flown to the International Space Station, in part due to an interruption in Space Shuttle flights after the Space Shuttle Columbia disaster.
