= Mars MetNet =

Cancelled science mission to Mars featuring semi-hard landing strategy

- Mars MetNet impactor concept
- Mission type: Technology; Atmospheric science
- Operator: Finnish Meteorological Institute
- Website: http://fmispace.fmi.fi/index.php?id=metnet

Spacecraft properties
- Landing mass: entry mass: 22.2 kg per unit
- Payload mass: 4 kg allocation
- Dimensions: Impactor: 1.8 m diameter
- Power: 0.6 W

Start of mission
- Launch date: TBD
- Rocket: TBD

Mars impactor

Mars MetNet was a planned atmospheric science mission to Mars, initiated by the Finnish Meteorological Institute (FMI) together with Russia and Spain. By September 2013, two flight-capable entry, descent and landing systems (EDLS) were manufactured and tested. As of 2015 baseline funding existed until 2020. As of 2016, neither the launch vehicle nor precursory launch date have been set.

The objective is to establish a widespread surface observation network on Mars to investigate the planet's atmospheric structure, physics and meteorology. The bulk of the mission consist of at least 16 MetNet impact landers deployed over the Martian surface.

== History ==
The basic concepts of Mars MetNet were initiated by the Finnish Meteorological Institute (FMI) team in late 1980s. The concept was matured over a decade, and eventually the development work started in the year 2000. MetNet can be considered as a successor of the NetLander, Russian Mars 96 and the earlier ESA Marsnet and InterMarsnet mission concepts. Of these Mars 96 went all the way to launch, but failure on the trans-mars injection with fourth stage of the rocket caused it to re-enter Earth and break-up. As part of this multi-part mission were two penetrators quite like MetNet. Main difference being that on the impact the front part would separate from the back and delve some meters deeper into ground.

MetNet was among the missions proposed at the European Geosciences Union General Assembly in April 2016.

=== Status ===
The scope of the Mars MetNet mission is eventually to deploy several tens of impact landers on the Martian surface. Mars MetNet is being developed by a consortium consisting of the Finnish Meteorological Institute (Mission Lead), the Russian Space Research Institute (IKI) (in cooperation with Lavochkin Association), and Instituto Nacional de Técnica Aeroespacial (INTA) from Spain.

The baseline program development funding exists until 2020. Definition of the precursory mission and discussions on launch opportunities are currently under way. The precursory mission would consist of one lander and is intended as a technology and science demonstration mission. If successful and if funded, more landers are proposed to be deployed in the following launch windows.

By 2013, all qualification activities had been completed and the payload and flight model components were being manufactured. By September 2013, two flight-capable entry, descent and landing systems (EDLS) had been manufactured and tested with acceptance levels. One of those two probes is being used for further environment tests, while a second is currently considered flight-worthy. The tests covered resistance to vibration, heat, and mechanical impact shock, and are ongoing as of April 2015. The test EDLS unit may later be refurbished for flight.

== Scientific objectives ==
Detailed characterization of the Martian circulation patterns, boundary layer phenomena, and climatological cycles requires simultaneous in situ meteorological measurements from networks of stations on the Martian surface. The fact that both meteorology in particular and climatology in general vary both temporally and spatially means that the most effective means of monitoring these is to make simultaneous measurements at multiple locations and over a sufficiently long period of time. Mars MetNet includes both a global-scale, multi-point network of surface probes supplemented by a supporting satellite in orbit, for a projected duration of two Martian years. Somewhere in the range of ten to twenty observation points is seen as a minimum to get a good picture of atmospheric phenomena on a planet-wide scale.

Scientific objectives of the lander are to study:

- Atmospheric dynamics and circulation
- Surface to atmosphere interactions and planetary boundary layer
- Dust raising mechanisms
- Cycles of CO_{2}, H_{2}O and dust
- Evolution of the Martian climate

The purpose of the Mars MetNet Precursor Mission is to confirm the concept of deployment for the mini-meteorological stations onto the Martian surface, to obtain atmospheric data during the descent phase, and to obtain information about the meteorology and surface structure at the landing site during one Martian year or longer.

== Lander concept ==
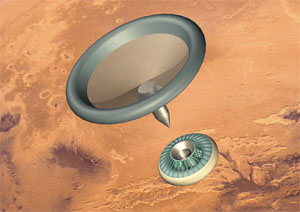
Artist's rendering of a MetNet impactor entering the Martian atmosphere. Lower module: inflatable heat shield; upper module: 1.8 m inflatable decelerator

Each MetNet lander, or impactor probe, will use an inflatable entry and descent system instead of rigid heat shields and parachutes as earlier semi-hard landing devices have used. This way the ratio of the payload mass to the overall mass is optimized, and more mass and volume resources are spared for the science payload. The MetNet lander's atmospheric descent process can be partitioned into two phases: the primary aerodynamic or the 'Inflatable Braking Unit' deceleration phase, and the secondary aerodynamic or the 'Additional Inflatable Braking Unit' deceleration phase. The probes will have a final landing speed of 44.6 to 57.6 m/s. The operational lifetime of a lander on the Martian surface will be seven years.

== Deployment ==
=== As secondary payload ===
As the requirements for a transfer vehicle are not very extensive, the Mars MetNet impact landers could be launched with any mission going to Mars. The landers could piggyback on a Martian orbiter from ESA, NASA, Russia or China or an add-on to larger Martian landers like ExoMars.

=== Dedicated launch ===
Also a dedicated launch with several units from low Earth orbit is under study. Most of the Mars MetNet landers would be deployed to Mars separately a few weeks prior to the arrival to Mars to decrease the amount of required fuel for deceleration maneuvers. The satellite platform would then be inserted to an orbit around Mars and the last few Mars MetNet impact landers would be deployed to the Martian surface form the orbit around Mars to be able to land on any selected areas of the Martian surface in a latitude range of +/- 30 degrees for optimal solar panel efficiency. A sounder on board the orbiter would perform continuous atmospheric soundings, thus complementing the in situ observations. The orbiter will also serve as the primary data relay between the impact landers and the Earth.

== Precursory mission ==
A technology demonstrator mission called 'Mars MetNet Precursory Mission' could be launched either piggy-backing with another Mars mission or with a dedicated launch using the Russian Volna — a converted submarine sea-launched ballistic missile.

The Finnish Meteorological Institute (FMI) originally planned to launch the demonstration lander on board the Phobos Grunt mission on 2011. However, the Mars MetNet lander was dropped from the Phobos-Grunt mission due to weight constraints on the spacecraft. Phobos-Grunt later failed to depart Earth orbit and crashed into the Pacific Ocean on January 16, 2012. The precursory mission launch date is yet to be determined.

=== Payload ===
The notional payload of the Mars MetNet Precursor Mission may include the following instruments:

- MetBaro: pressure sensor with a 1015 hPa limit (100 g)
- MetHumi: humidity sensor (15 g)
- MetTemp: temperature sensor with a range from -110 °C to +30 °C (2 g)
- Panoramic camera with four lenses mounted at 90° intervals (100 g)
- MetSIS: a solar radiance sensor with an optical wireless communications system for data transfer
- Dust Sensor: an infrared dust and gas detector (42 g)

=== Power ===
The impact landers are equipped with flexible solar panels, located on the upper side of the inflatable braking unit, that will provide approximately 0.6 W during the day. As the provided power output is insufficient to operate all instruments simultaneously, they are activated sequentially according to the different environmental constraints.

== See also ==
- Schiaparelli EDM lander, the 2016 ExoMars lander
- ExoMars 2020 surface platform
