= Carnegie Moscow Center =

Moscow-based think tank

- Established: 1994
- Dissolved: 2022
- Type: Think tank
- Headquarters: 16/2 Tverskaya St., Moscow
- Director: Dmitri Trenin
- Website: carnegie.ru

The Carnegie Moscow Center (Russian: Московский центр Карнеги) was a Moscow-based think tank that focuses on domestic and foreign policy. It was established in 1994 as a regional affiliate of the Carnegie Endowment for International Peace. It was the number one think tank in Central and Eastern Europe and the 26th top think tank in the world, according to the University of Pennsylvania's 2014 Global Go To Think Tank Index. In April 2022, the Carnegie Moscow Center was forced to close at the direction of the Russian government.

== Controversies ==
According to American journalist James Kirchick, the Carnegie Moscow Center was one of the leading "Western" think tanks in the field of Russian research, but the situation changed after the 2012 Russian presidential election, when Vladimir Putin became the president of Russia again. In January 2013, Putin's critic and the then chair of the think tank's Society and Regions Program, Nikolai Petrov, left the center after the cancellation of his program. Petrov said that the decision to cancel the program was initiated by the head of the center, Dmitri Trenin, who did not want to annoy Putin. In 2014, the then editor-in-chief of the center's magazine, Maria Lipman, and Russian political scientist Lilia Shevtsova also left the center. Both Lipman and Shevtsova were also critics of Putin.

The Center's director Dmitri Trenin was described by Russian political writer Andrey Piontkovsky as an "elite Kremlin propagandist targeting the Western expert audience" suggesting that the Carnegie Foundation was complicit in Kremlin propaganda for the 30 years Trenin was director of Carnegie's Moscow Center.

== Scholars ==
- Dmitri Trenin, director of the center, chair of the research council and the Foreign and Security Policy Program.
- Alexander Gabuev, senior associate, chair of the Russia in the Asia-Pacific Program.
- Andrei Kolesnikov, senior associate, chair of the Russian Domestic Politics and Political Institutions Program.
- Andrey Movchan, nonresident scholar in the Economic Policy Program.
- Alexander Baunov, senior associate, editor-in-chief of Carnegie.ru.
- Maxim Samorukov, fellow, deputy editor of Carnegie.ru.
