= Lev Zelyony =

Russian physicist (born 1948)

Lev Matveevich Zeleny
- Born: August 23, 1948 (age 78); Moscow
- Scientific career
- Fields: Physics
- Workplaces: Russian Space Research Institute

Lev Matveevich Zelenyi (Russian: Лев Матвеевич Зелёный, born August 23, 1948) is a Soviet and Russian physicist, an expert in space plasma physics, the physics of solar-terrestrial relations, nonlinear dynamics and planetary research.

He is an Academician of the Russian Academy of Sciences (2008, Corresponding Member 2003), Doctor of Physical and Mathematical Sciences, Professor.

He served as Director of the Space Research Institute of the Russian Academy of Sciences (2002-2017), ultimately as scientific advisor. He was vice president of the Russian Academy of Sciences in 2013–2017, and member of the Presidium of the Russian Academy of Sciences. He is a foreign member of the Bulgarian Academy of Sciences (2008), and a full member of the International Academy of Astronautics.

His main area of scientific activity is the physics of space plasma. He has published more than 700 scientific articles, and has about 7,000 citations of his works published after 1975.

== Life ==
In 1972 he graduated from the Department of Aerophysics and Space Research of the Moscow Institute of Physics and Technology. Thereafter he worked at the Space Research Institute of the RAS. He began to study the physics of space plasma under the supervision of Albert Galeev.

In January 2012 following the reentry of the Fobos-Grunt spacecraft, Zeleny proposed a repeat mission called Fobos-Grunt 2, on behalf of mission scientist Alexander Zakharov. However, with Roscosmos reaching an agreement with ESA in March 2012 to participate in the ExoMars programme, the agency concentrated its efforts on that programme.

== Bibliography ==
- Zelenyi, L. M.; Zakharov, A. V. (2010). "Phobos-Grunt project: Devices for scientific studies". Solar System Research. 44 (5): 359. Bibcode:2010SoSyR..44..359Z. doi:10.1134/S0038094610050011. S2CID 121719627.
