= Mat Kaplan =

American radio personality

- Occupation: Radio personality
- Years active: 2002–present

Mat Kaplan is an American radio personality. He is the former host of Planetary Radio, a radio talk show about space exploration produced by The Planetary Society.

== Career ==
Kaplan's extensive background in journalism has ranged from public radio reporter covering political conventions to movie reviewer for an international magazine, as well as a correspondent for a couple of pioneering national TV series about computers. Kaplan has been working in broadcasting since the age of 17. He also worked for 30 years as a technology and media manager for a local university where he oversaw the campus television station.

== Personal life ==
Kaplan spent most of his career working in Long Beach. He currently lives in San Diego, California, with his wife. He has two adult daughters and one grandson.

== See also ==
- Planetary Radio
- Planetary Society
