= Maria Lipman =

Russian journalist and political scientist

- Мария Липман
- Born: 25 October 1952; Moscow (Soviet Union)
- Education: Master of Arts
- Alma mater: Philological Faculty of Moscow State University
- Occupation: Journalist, political scientist, pundit, expert
- Employer: Foreign Affairs; George Washington University
- Position held: visiting scholar

Maria Alexandrovna Lipman (Russian: Мария Александровна Липман; born 1952) is a Russian journalist, political scientist and Russia expert, who edited the magazine of the Carnegie Moscow Center until 2014. She is a Senior Visiting Fellow at the Institute of European, Russian and Eurasian Studies at George Washington University and Co-Editor of the institute's website Russia.Post. She also writes for Foreign Affairs.

== Early life and career ==
Lipman was born on 25 October 1952 in Moscow. In 1974 she graduated from the Department of Structural and Applied Linguistics of the Faculty of Philology of Moscow State University. From 1991 to 1995, she worked as a translator, researcher and contributor for The Washington Post. Since 2001 she has had a monthly op-ed in The Post. From 1995 to 2001, she was deputy editor-in-chief of the Itogi magazine. From 2001 to 2003 she was the deputy editor-in-chief of the Weekly journal. As a Distinguished Fellow of Russian Studies, she resided at Indiana University Bloomington for the Spring semester of 2018.

She speaks English and Russian.

== Views ==
Writing in Foreign Affairs claims, "The crackdown that followed Putin's return to the Kremlin in 2012 extended to the liberal media, which had until then been allowed to operate fairly independently."

== Published works ==
- Lipman, Maria (2016). "How Putin Silences Dissent: Inside the Kremlin's Crackdown". Vol. 95#1. Foreign Affairs. p. 38.
- Lipman, Maria (12 August 2019). "A Review of Tony Wood on "Russia Without Putin: Money, Power, and the Myths of the New Cold War". Foreign Affairs.
- Maria Lipman (February 2021). "Review of Barnes Carr on: The Lenin Plot: The Unknown Story of America's War Against Russia". Foreign Affairs.
