= Renaissance Credit =

Russian banking institution

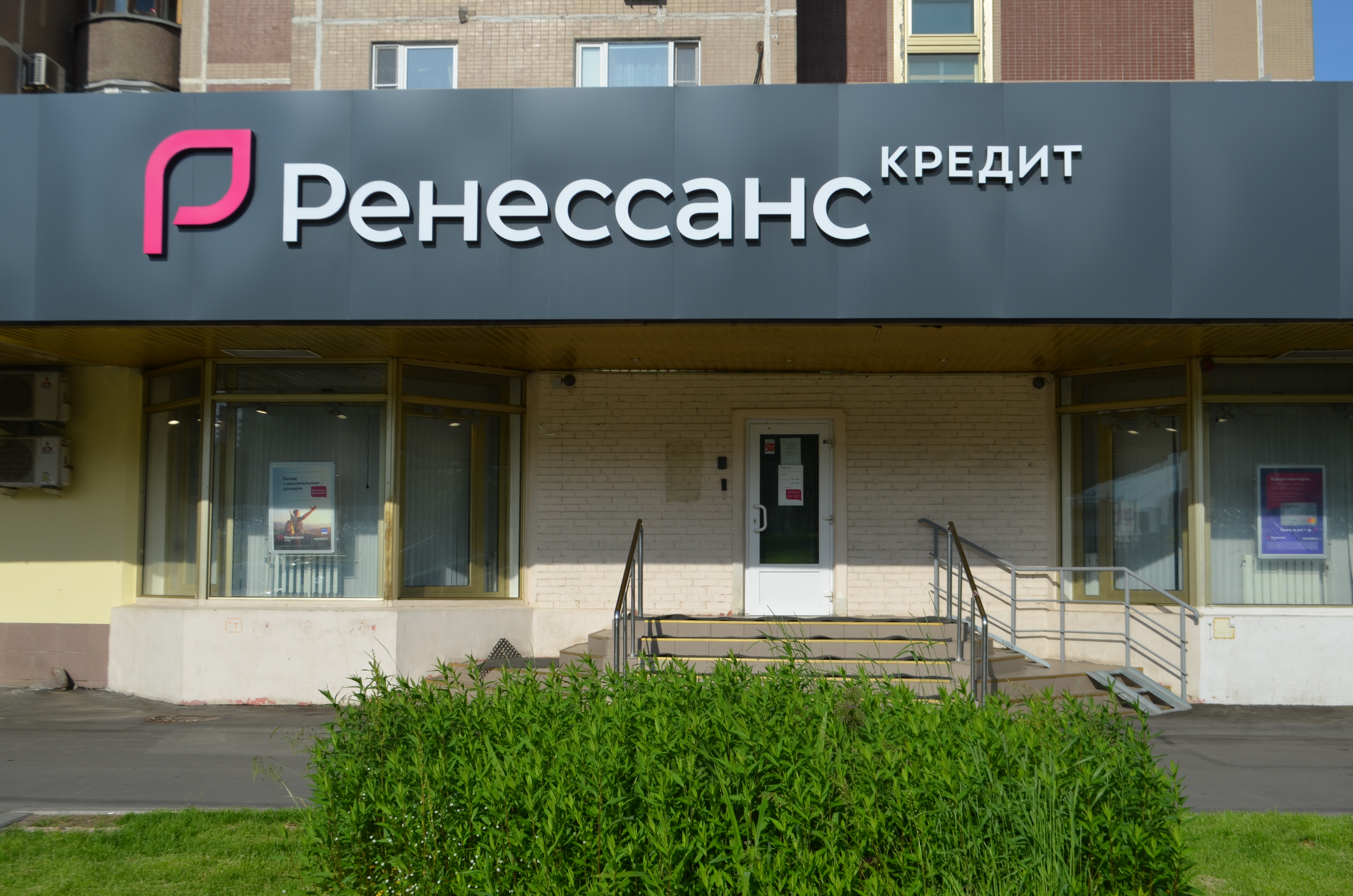
- Renaissance Credit bank branch in Moscow in 2020
- Formerly: AllianceInvest
- Company type: Limited liability company
- Industry: Financial services
- Founded: November 24, 2000; 24 years ago
- Headquarters: Moscow, Russia
- Area served: Russia
- Key people: Tatiana Khondru (Chairman)
- Products: Banking services
- Revenue: 29,566,700,000 Russian ruble (2017)
- Parent: ONEXIM group
- Website: ren.credit

Renaissance Credit (Russian: Банк Ренессанс) is a Russian commercial bank providing retail banking services and headquartered in Moscow. The financial institution focuses on the consumer lending market and is one of the Top-100 Russian banks. Renaissance Credit (along with its parent company Renaissance Capital) is a subsidiary of ONEXIM Group. In 2013, Russian billionaire Mikhail Prokhorov took the largest stake in Renaissance Credit through his company Onexim Group.

As with other Russian banks, Renaissance Credit was sanctioned by the United States government after Russian invasion of Ukraine, in response the bank closed its London, New York and Johannesburg offices.

== History ==
The bank was established in 2000 under the name AllianceInvest. In 2002, he received the title of "Treasurer". In 2003, the bank was acquired by Renaissance Group and renamed in Renaissance Capital. This allowed Renaissance Group to enter the retail consumer lending market. In 2007, the bank began operating under the Renaissance Credit brand, and in 2013, its official name became the same.

In 2012, the Bank issued unsecured loans by 66.7 billion rubles putting the bank in 7th place in Russia.

The total volume of the portfolio issued by non-tax loans as of January 1, 2013, amounted to 62.6 billion rubles.

In June 2013, Standard & Poor's rating agency has assigned a long-term rating "B+" with a stable outlook.

== Owners and management ==
The main owner of the bank is the ONEXIM group, which owns 83.02% in its authorized capital. Another 6.5% is owned by Evgeny Yurchenko.

At the beginning of 2012, the ONEXIM Group acquired a 32.25% stake in the bank from Renaissance Group, and in November 2012 it bought out the remaining stake in Renaissance Group, increasing its stake to 89.52%. During the last transaction, the Renaissance Capital investment bank, which was completely bought out by the group, also became the property of ONEXIM.

Evgeny Yurchenko acquired his stake in ONEXIM Group in May 2013.

== Activity ==
Renaissance Credit is a bank working with individuals. The main activity of the Bank is related to the issuance of consumer loans, credit cards and deposits.

The bank has about 150 branches in Russia, and also cooperates with major federal retail chains.
