= NetLander =

Cancelled Mars orbiter and multiple lander mission

In 2007–2009, CNES (French Space Agency) and ESA (European Space Agency) had planned to send a remote sensing orbiter and four small Netlanders to Mars. They planned to land them in four locations. The CNES and ESA cancelled this mission because it was too expensive; both agencies planned to send other orbiters and landers for missions like ExoMars.

== History ==
The Landers' mission was to take pictures of the landing site and explore Mars's internal surface and atmosphere. Each of the four landers was to carry instruments for the following measurements:

- Seismometer, IPG, France
- Panoramic camera, DLR, Germany
- Atmospheric sensors, FMI, Finland
- Atmospheric electricity sensor, CETP, France
- geodesic and ionospheric measurements, GRGS, France
- Soil properties measurements, University of Münster, Germany
- Ground Penetrating Radar, CETP, France
- Magnetometer, CETP, France
- Microphone, University of California, Berkeley, US

The Orbiter's mission was to take pictures from orbit, explore Mars's atmosphere and relay information and images from the Netlanders.

The MetNet multi-lander mission to Mars was based on the legacy of NetLander, and was planned to launch in 2011–2019. The NetLander design has been examined as the basis for a small Solar System body lander, such as a comet.

== See also ==
- ExoMars (Europes big Mars mission in the 2010s)
