= Lilia Shevtsova =

Kremlinologist

- Лилия Шевцова
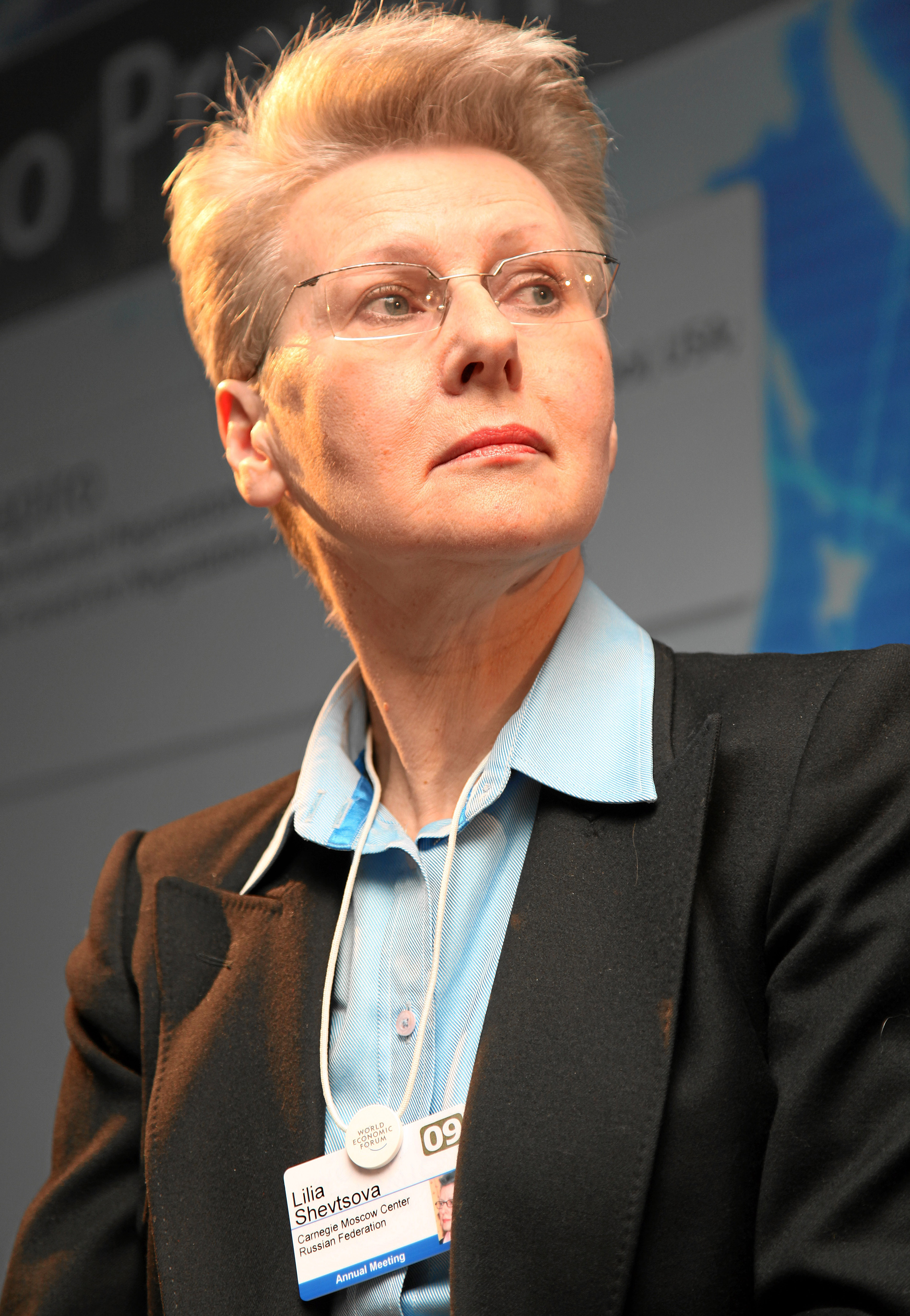
- Lilia Shevtsova at the 2009 World Economic Forum
- Born: 7 October 1949 (age 76); Lviv, Ukrainian SSR
- Education: MGIMO
- Occupations: Journalist; historian; writer
- Employer(s): Georgetown University; Berkeley University of California; Chatham House; Carnegie Endowment
- Awards: Order of the Cross of Terra Mariana

Lilia Fyodorovna Shevtsova (Russian: Ли́лия Фёдоровна Шевцо́ва; born 7 October 1949 in Lviv, Ukrainian SSR) is a Kremlinology expert.

== Biography ==
Shevtsova received B.A. and M.A. in history and journalism from Moscow State Institute of International Relations in 1971. She also received Ph.D. in political science from the Academy of Social Sciences of the Central Committee of the Communist Party of the Soviet Union (the highest educational establishment of the CPSU, which prepared theoretical workers for Party institutions) in 1976. She served as director of the Center for Political Studies in Moscow, and as deputy director of the Moscow Institute of International Economic and Political Studies.

Shevtsova taught political science at Georgetown University, Berkeley University, Cornell University and was visiting professor at the Davis Center for Russia and Eurasian Studies at Harvard University. She was Senior Associate of Carnegie Endowment for International Peace, founding chair of the Davos World Economic Forum GLOBAL AGENDA COUNCIL ON future of Russia. She served as Chair of the Program on Eurasia and Eastern Europe, SSRC (Washington); was member of the Social Council for Central and Eastern European Studies and non-resident Senior Fellow at the Brookings Institution. She was Reagan-Fascell Democracy Fellow at the National Endowment for Democracy and an Associate Fellow at the Russia and Eurasia Program at the Chatham House (London). She was the Richard von Weizsäcker Fellow at the Robert Bosch Academy.

Lilia Shevtsova is Honorary Doctor in Social Sciences (Dr. rer. soc. h. c.) at the St. Gallen University. She is member of the Liberal Mission Foundation Board (Moscow). She is member of the Boards of Finnish Centre for Excellence in Russian Studies (Helsinki) and Andrei Sakharov Center on Democratic Development (Lithuania); member of the Editorial Boards of the journals “American Interest”,"American Purpose", “Journal of Democracy” and “New Eastern Europe“.

Shevtsova was awarded the Estonian state order – Order of the Cross of Terra Mariana for participation in the democracy promotion.

== Influence ==
In the 2008 Top 100 Public Intellectuals Poll she was ranked 36. She has been writing for Foreign Policy magazine, the American Interest, the Foreign Affaires, the Journal of Democracy, the Current History, the Financial Times, the Washington Post, Die Presse, Der Standard, Diplomaatia, The Moscow Times, Communist and Post-Communist Studies, Le Monde Diplomatique, Aus Politik und Zeiteschiche, Deutsche Ausenpolitik, The Berlin Journal. Her areas of expertise include: Eastern Europe, Political reform, Russia, Politics of Russia, and Ukraine, relations between Russia and the West.

== Published work ==
- Lonely Power: Why Russia Has Failed to Become the West and the West is Weary of Russia (2010)
- Putin's Russia (January 2005)
- Lonely Superpower: Russia's Uneasy Relationship With the West (June 2010)
- Russia – Lost in Transition: The Yeltsin and Putin Legacies (November 2007)
- Russia's Engagement With the West: Transformation And Integration in the Twenty-first Century (June 2005)
- Yeltsin's Russia: Myths and Reality (May 1999)
- Political Pluralism in Post-Communist Russia, in: Alexander Dallin (ed.): Political Parties in Russia, International and Area Studies, Research Series No. 88, University of California at Berkeley 1993 ISBN 0-87725-188-6
- Russia's Coronavirus Drama, The Berlin Journal
- Russia as the Global Challenge
- Russia's Corona Challenge: Domestic and Foreign Policy Implications

== See also ==
- Soviet Union–United States relations
- Russia–United States relations
- Economy of the Soviet Union
- Economy of Russia
- Russian studies
- Cold War
