= SkyFall (helicopter) =

Proposed NASA Mars helicopter

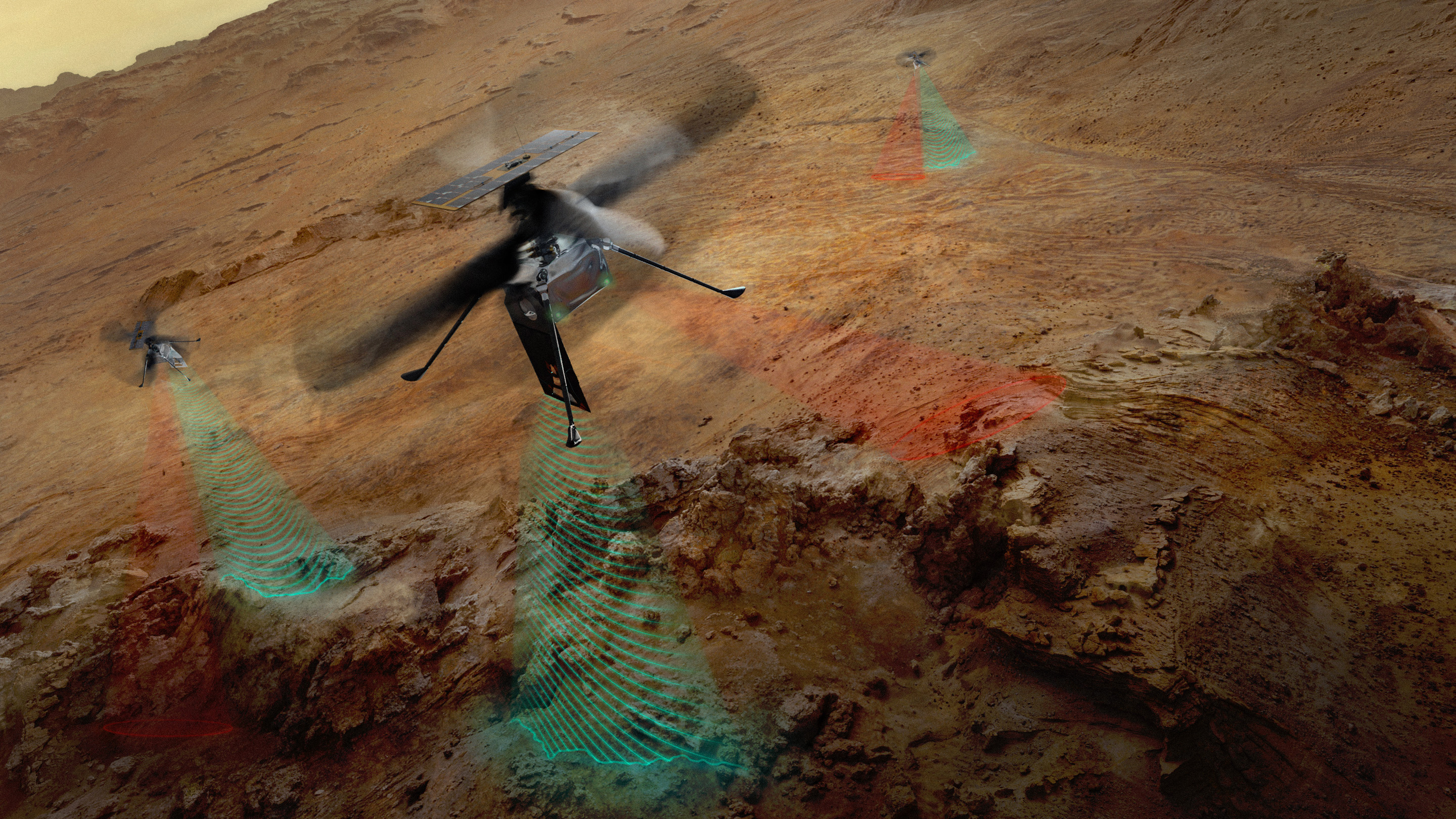
- Concept art of the SkyFall helicopter
- Type: Extraterrestrial autonomous UAV helicopter
- Owner: NASA
- Manufacturer: Jet Propulsion Laboratory; AeroVironment

Specifications
- Dry mass: 5 lb (2.3 kg)
- Power: Solar array-charged Li ion batteries

History
- Deployed: 2028; from Space Reactor-1 Freedom (planned)

NASA Mars helicopters

SkyFall is a upcoming NASA mission that consists of three autonomous helicopters that will operate on the surface of Mars.

== Development ==
The concept for a six-helicopter swarm was pitched by teams from AeroVironment and Jet Propulsion Laboratory in early 2025. The mission was conceptualised to perform water resource scouting and provide critical data that guides future mission planning, including selection of landing sites for potential human missions to Mars. Each helicopter has been proposed to operate independently of the others. A larger portion of the development of the mission concept derives from JPL's transfer of technology related to avionics, flight software, and modeling systems to AeroVironment, who has been appointed for co-designing and co-manufacturing components for the SkyFall helicopters with JPL. The Skyfall mission was officially announced by NASA administrator Jared Isaacman at the NASA Ignition event in 2026 as a three-helicopter component to map water ice on Mars. The mission is to launch as an additional payload on the Space Reactor‑1 Freedom mission scheduled for late 2028. The mission received initial criticism as it was announced out of budget and conceived primarily as a demonstration mission, not a scientific one.

== Design ==
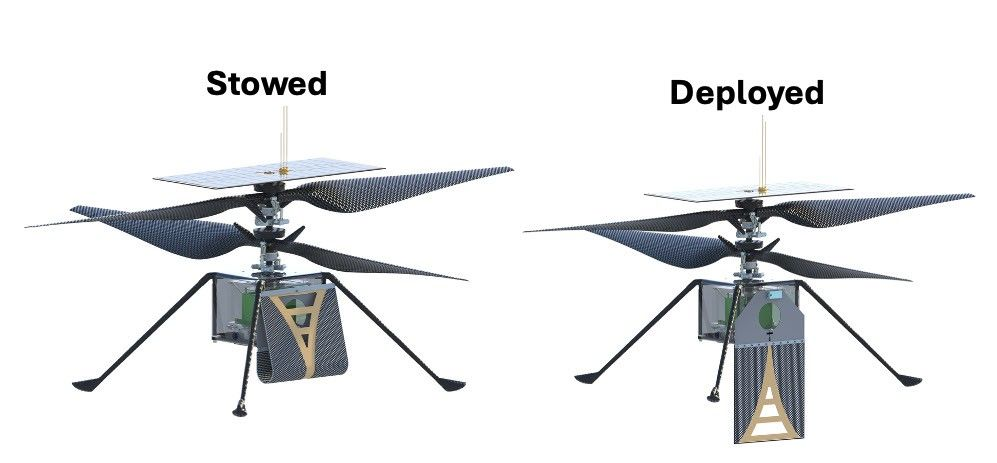
SkyFall artist's concept showing views of the Mars helicopter with its ground-penetrating radar stowed, before its initial mid-air takeoff, and deployed, when the antenna unfurls during flight.

The SkyFall helicopters use the same technology as pioneered by the Ingenuity helicopter. It will have a height of 52 centimetres (20 in) and a mass of 5 kilograms (11 lb). It will be propelled by an electric motor, driving two counter-rotating co-axial blades, each of length 1.35 metres (4.4 ft). JPL engineers have demonstrated the ability of the helicopters blades to break the sound barrier on Mars, with a design rated speed of Mach 1.08, as compared to Ingenuity's subsonic Mach 0.7. They are optimised to spin at 3,570 rpm giving a flight speed of Mach 0.98, although earlier designs evaluated the concept of a slower three-bladed rotor at a higher 3,750 rpm. The new blade design allows for more lift to be produced, allowing greater payload capacity for the helicopter.

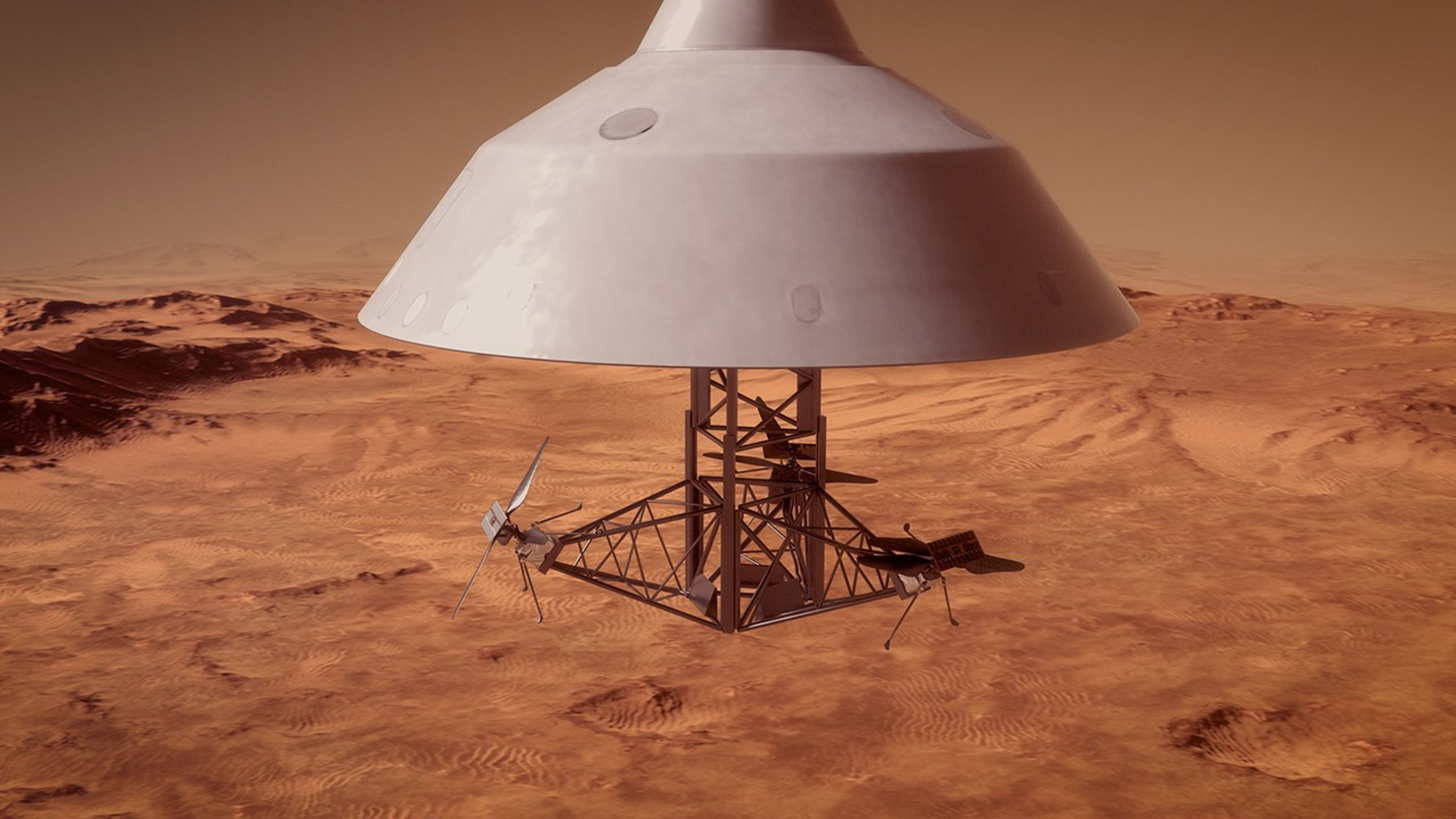
Artist's concept of the three SkyFall helicopters suspended beneath the backshell during their descent through the Martian atmosphere.

The EDL components for the SkyFall mission would be built by Firefly Aerospace via a $13 million subcontract from JPL. The aeroshell, heat shield and other support platforms will be made at Firefly's Gloworks facility in Texas. Instead of having a conventional lander, all three helicopters will detach from the aeroshell and would use their own power to land on Mars. This has been dubbed the "Skyfall maneuver". During each flight, the helicopters are expected to use cameras and ground-penetrating radar to map the local terrain, assess potential landing hazards and possibly locate subsurface ice, which are important factors for a crewed mars mission. The mission concept has been designed to supplement Mars rovers and orbiters, with their agility and speed permitting scientists to explore a wider area faster and at less cost.

=== Instruments ===
All three SkyFall helicopters are identical and will have four payloads. Unlike the technology demonstration of the Ingenuity mission, Skyfall helicopters have been designed to carry out scientific and exploration tasks.

==== Optical and near-infrared cameras ====
13-megapixel color cameras are being developed for the mission. They can also be used to create 3D images and aid identification of hazardous objects. Specialized near-IR cameras will be used to analyze to analyze the composition of Martian soil near landing sites.

==== Ground-penetrating radar ====
The helicopters will each carry a small ground-penetrating radar antenna that will be hung from the side of the spacecraft, akin to a cape. The mission would use a type of flexible antenna called Vivaldi that was first developed in 1978 and is to survey up to 5 metres (16 ft) below the Martian surface. The antenna is significantly longer than the helicopter's landing legs, which has resulted in it being designed to bend out of the way during a landing. It is protected by multiple layers of polyester and Vectran and weighs about 142 grams (5.0 oz). By August 2026, JPL engineers had tested the antenna for over 200 possible landing scenarios.

==== Temperature sensors ====
Specialised temperature sensors to provide local temperature and measure local wind patterns and directions in flight.

==== Radiation monitor ====
A dedicated commercial off-the-shelf micro dosimeter derived from LRO instrumentation will be used for the mission.

== Mission history ==
The mission is expected to launch in late 2028, as a co-manifested payload on the SR-1 Freedom mission. Its landing site is yet to be determined.

== See also ==
- ARES – 2008 robotic Mars aircraft proposal
- Dragonfly – Robotic rotorcraft mission to Saturn's moon Titan, planned launch in 2028
- Mars Aerial and Ground Global Intelligent Explorer – Solar aircraft concept to fly in Mars atmosphere
- Mars Piloted Orbital Station – crewed Mars orbital command module concept to control robots on and above the surface
- Sky-Sailor – 2004 proposal of a robotic Mars aircraft
- Exploration of Mars
