= Sky-Sailor =

2004 proposal of a robotic Mars aircraft

The Sky-Sailor is a concept for a robotic aircraft with embedded solar cells on its wings, conceived in 2004 by the Swiss Federal Institute of Technology in Zurich. It is hoped it would be able to study the Martian surface. Sky-Sailor would be an autonomous, solar-powered Mars aircraft that would fly for one Martian day of 24 hours and scan features on the surface of Mars. If this project is funded and developed, it would be able to take detailed pictures of Mars, especially in places where wheeled rovers can not go.

== Concept and design ==
The challenge for the developers was to make a very light weight model, which was accomplished. After that, an autopilot had to be installed so a non-stop autonomous flight for 24 hours could be achieved. All this was tested with a scale model in a wind tunnel.

Two major challenges for small autonomous aircraft for Mars are to keep the weight down, such as batteries and electronics, and designing the autonomous control systems for directing the flight. One design consideration is the amount of solar power available over the course of a Martian day, and another is the battery storage capacity and the efficiency and weight of the solar cells. One reason for a small size was to facilitate its transport to planet Mars from Earth.

The Sky-Sailor concept has a wingspan of about 3.2 meters and it weighs approximately 2.5 kilograms. Aerodynamic studies suggest the power needed for the aircraft to fly at a low altitude is about 13.2 watts.

== Test flights ==
In 2007 a solar powered prototype made two flights totaling 10 hours. With a new battery, in 2008 it flew for 27 hours.

== Mission to Mars ==
If developed, the aircraft would be carried to Mars in a small aeroshell and that would be attached to a carrier spacecraft. Once the spacecraft has reached Mars, the aeroshell would be directly released into the Martian atmosphere.

In 12 hours it could cover about 1,700 km (1,050 miles) over Mars, with the flight culminating in a crash landing.

== See also ==
- ARES
- Helios Prototype
- Mars aircraft
- Mini-Sniffer
- Mars Helicopter Ingenuity
- Dragonfly mission to Titan
