= Joel S. Levine =

Planetary and atmospheric scientist; studies the atmospheres of Earth and Mars

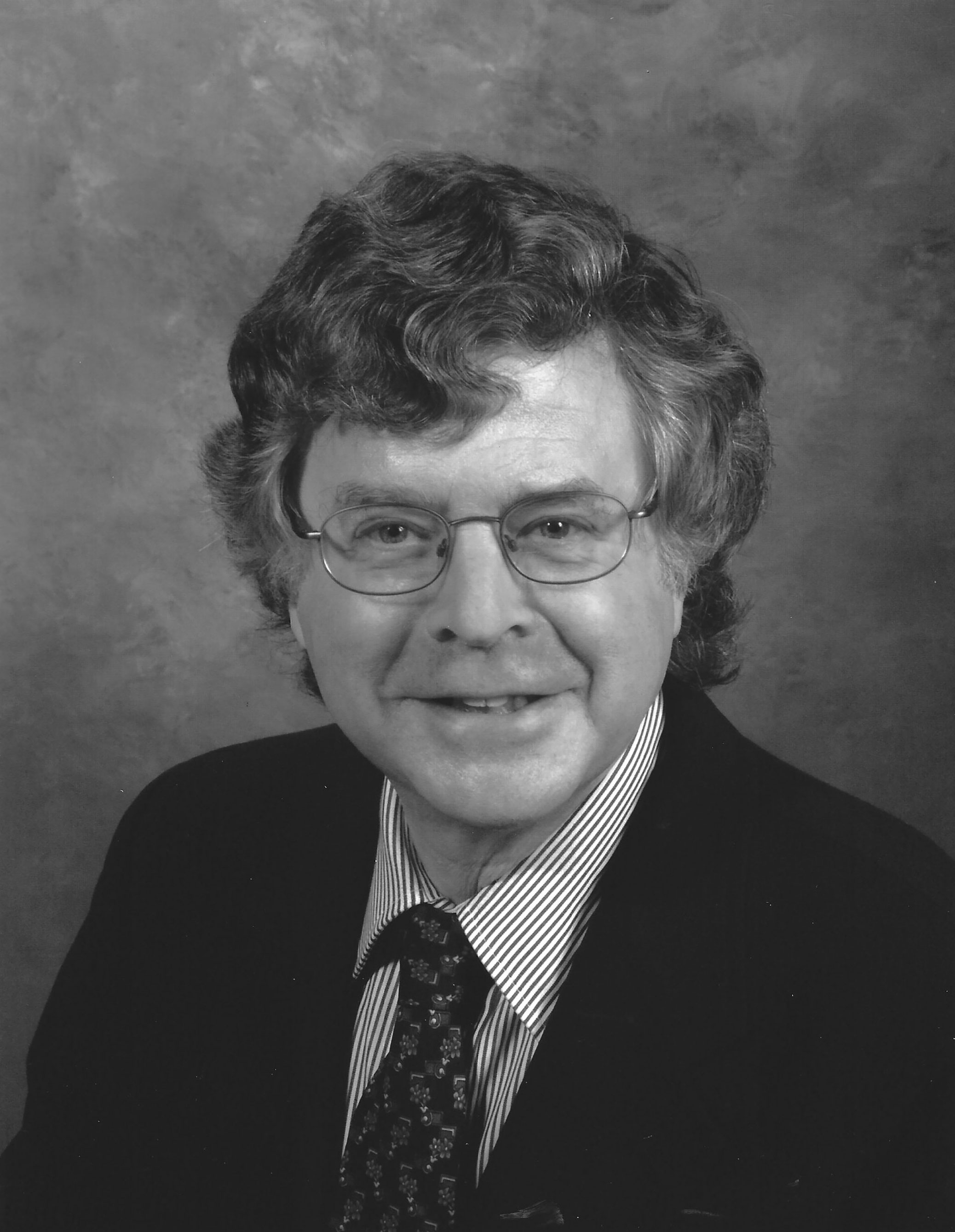
- A NASA portrait of Levine
- Born: 1942 (age 83–84); Brooklyn, New York City, U.S.
- Education: Brooklyn College, New York University, University of Michigan
- Known for: Original research on: Mars, The Early Atmosphere and Evolution of the Atmosphere of Earth and Mars, Atmospheric Chemistry, Biomass Burning, and Global Climate Change. Planning for the return of humans to the Moon, and for the planned Human Exploration of Mars Assisted the National Archives in the Preservation of the Charters of Freedom Member of NASA's Chilean Trapped Miner Support Team
- Spouse: Arlene S. Levine
- Children: 1
- Scientific career
- Workplaces: NASA, College of William & Mary

Joel S. Levine (born 1942) is an American planetary scientist, author, and research professor in applied science at the College of William & Mary, specializing in the atmospheres of the Moon, Earth, and Mars. He has worked as a senior research scientist at NASA, developing scientific models of the evolution of the Earth's early atmosphere, as well as creating models of the Martian atmosphere for use during the Viking 1 and 2 Mars Orbiter and Lander Missions, and was principal investigator and chief scientist of the proposed ARES Mars Airplane Mission. He also formed and led the "Charters of Freedom Research Team," a group of 12 NASA scientists who worked with the National Archive and Records Administration (NARA) to preserve the United States Declaration of Independence, the Constitution, and the Bill of Rights when small white spots began appearing on the documents in 1988. Levine's past work also includes assisting in the design of the rescue vehicle that saved 33 Chilean miners in the 2010 Copiapó mining accident, as well as original research on the feasibility of the "nuclear winter" hypothesis, and the effects of uncontrolled fires on global warming.

Levine is married to Arlene Spielholz, a former NASA scientist who studied the psychological effects of astronauts spending long time periods in space, and has a daughter and grandson.

== Early life ==
Levine was born in Brooklyn, New York, on May 14, 1942. He became interested in astronomy at age 13, when he discovered images of Mars taken at Mount Wilson Observatory in a school textbook. As a teenager he attended Thomas Jefferson High School, graduating in 1960, and later studied at Brooklyn College at City University of New York, where he earned a bachelor of science in physics with a minor in astronomy in 1964, and New York City University, where he earned an M.S. in meteorology in 1967. As a graduate student at New York University, he worked as a research assistant at the NASA Goddard Institute for Space Studies (GISS) on the campus of Columbia University, where he wrote a research paper about the surface and atmosphere of Mars and investigated possible explanations for an observed "ashen light" on Venus. In 1968, he married Arlene Spielholz, who at the time was doing graduate work at Columbia University, teaching English to non-English-speaking students in Brooklyn. In 1973, he received an M.S. in Aeronomy and Planetary Science at the University of Michigan and earned a Ph.D. in Atmospheric Science at the same university in 1977.

== Career ==
In 1970, Langley Research Center associate director John Edward Duberg recruited Levine to work on the Viking program. Levine joined the Center in July 1970 and was assigned to the Aeronomy Section of the Planetary Physics Branch. He continued working for NASA until his retirement in 2011.

During his time at NASA, Levine served as Senior Research Scientist of NASA's Science Mission Directorate at the Langley Research Center, Principal Investigator of NASA's research program on global biomass burning, Principal Investigator and chief scientist of the proposed ARES Mars Airplane Mission, co-chair of NASA's Human Exploration of Mars Science Analysis Group (HEM-SAG), was a member of the Chilean Miners Rescue Support Team, and served as Mars Scout Program Scientist in the Mars Exploration Program at NASA headquarters (2007–2009). In 1990, Levine became an adjunct professor at the College of William & Mary, where he headed the Atmospheric Sciences program. Levine taught courses on planetary, atmospheric, and climate science and policy in the evenings, while still working full-time at NASA during the day. Upon his formal retirement from NASA on June 30, 2011, he was appointed Research Professor in the Department of Applied Science at the College of William & Mary, and Consultant for the NASA Engineering and Safety Center (NESC) at the NASA Langley Research Center.

In 2010, Levine published "The Human Mission to Mars: Colonizing the Red Planet," a collection of essays by notable scientists and public figures discussing the potential challenges and resources required to colonize Mars. According to Fox News, Levine suggested using space advertising as a potential method to raise funding for a NASA Mars mission, which he claimed would be "a whole new economic plan for financing what has to be the greatest adventure in the history of the human race".

In July 2016, Levine served as organizer, chair and speaker at the Viking 40th Anniversary Science Symposium, a conference celebrating the impact of the Viking Program 40 years after first landing on Mars. On June 1, 2017, he was inducted into the Langley Research Center NACA and NASA Hall of Honor, an award given to only 37 NASA and NACA researchers as of his induction. Levine is the youngest member inducted as of February 1, 2021. Later that year, Levine served as organizer and co-chair of the NASA "Workshop on Dust in the Atmosphere of Mars and Its Impact on Human Exploration," the results of which were subsequently published by Cambridge Scholars Publishing in a book under the same name. In 2019, NASA asked Levine to organize and chair a workshop on “Lunar Dust and Its Impact on Human Exploration,” which he accepted. The workshop was held on February 11–13, 2020, in Houston, Texas, and the results were published in a NASA report on September 24, 2020, and by Cambridge Scholars Publishing on January 28, 2021. As of February 18, 2021, Levine is serving as an active consultant for the NASA Langley Research Center in Hampton, Virginia.

=== Work on Viking Program and other Mars missions ===
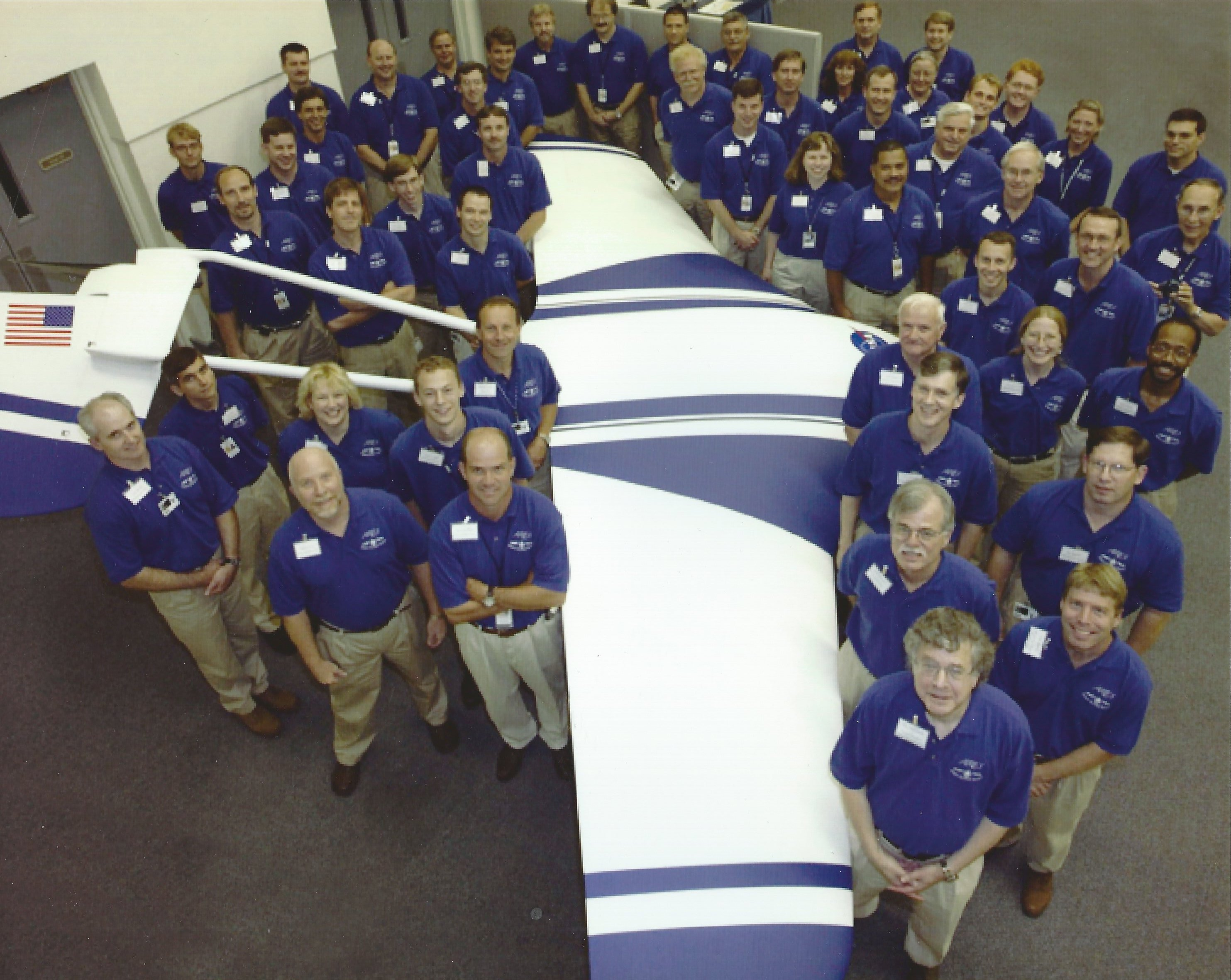
Levine (bottom right) poses with members of the ARES research team and a full-scale test airplane at the NASA Langley Research Center.

In 1974, the Soviet spacecraft Mars 6 crash-landed on Mars. Before crashing, an onboard ion pump sent a brief message signaling that the pump was working harder than scientists expected. One of several explanations for the pump not working properly was the presence of an unknown amount of argon gas in the Martian atmosphere, which could have been very hard to pump out of the device, potentially overloading the machine if there was too much argon. In order to ensure future Mars missions would not run into similar problems, NASA needed an accurate assessment of the chemical composition of the Martian atmosphere, which was not fully understood at the time. Levine was selected as a Guest Investigator on the NASA Copernicus Orbiting Astronomical Observatory, where he was able to obtain the first measurements of atomic hydrogen in the upper atmosphere of Mars at solar minimum prior to the Viking encounter with Mars. As a result of his observations, Levine developed a new model of the Martian upper atmosphere, which included argon, helium, and atomic hydrogen. Levine's work modeling the atmospheric composition of the Mars was, according to Brooklyn Eagle, crucial to the Viking Program's success.

Levine served as principal investigator of several NASA research programs and projects dealing with atmospheric chemistry, photochemical modeling of the atmosphere over geological time, atmospheric trace gases produced by atmospheric lightning and biogenic activity, fires, and global warming. Levine's Mars-related research activities continued in 1998, when he was appointed Chief Scientist of the proposed NASA/French Space Agency (CNES) Mars Airplane Package Mission (MAP). The objective of the MAP mission was to fly an airplane through the atmosphere of Mars. The mission was also intended in part to commemorate the 100th anniversary of the Wright Brothers first powered flight in 1903, but was cancelled in November 1998 for budgetary reasons. In the early 2000s, NASA created the Mars Scout Program, an initiative to send a series of small, low-cost robotic missions to Mars, with ideas competitively selected from proposals by the scientific community. By August 2002, 25 different proposals had been submitted, and from those, NASA chose only 4 to investigate further, with $500,000 invested for each project. One of the four finalists was Levine's Aerial Regional-scale Environmental Survey (ARES) program, a proposal to send a rocket powered airplane to fly a mile above the surface of Mars, which was designed to investigate the atmosphere, surface and sub-surface of Mars, and search for evidence of life. Levine was Principal Investigator of the program, and extensive plans were drawn up for the mission. It took just seven months to move from concept to a successful test of a half-scale prototype, which was flown successfully at 103,000 feet above Earth's surface. However, NASA ultimately decided to select the Phoenix stationary lander, designed by the University of Arizona; NASA's Jet Propulsion Laboratory; Lockheed Martin Space; and the Canadian Space Agency, for the first $386 million Mars Scout Mission.

In 2014, Levine served on the committee responsible for determining which scientific instruments would be used on the Perseverance Mars rover, choosing roughly a dozen experiments to land on Mars out of a pool of over 50 possible devices .

=== Atmospheric and climate change research ===
During the early 1970s, Levine worked on developing scientific models of the evolution of the Earth's early atmosphere, with particular emphasis on investigating the development of atmospheric ozone. In 1978, Levine lead a team at NASA which investigated the production of trace atmospheric gases by lightning. Through laboratory experiments, they determined that lightning produced trace but significant amounts of carbon monoxide and nitrous oxide, both of which can affect the ozone layer (the former positively and the latter negatively).

Levine also investigated the biogenic production of atmospheric gases on Earth, particularly through biomass burning, which he helped reveal to be an under-appreciated contributor to global warming.

=== Nuclear Winter investigation ===
In 1983, the concept of a "Nuclear Winter" was proposed by a group of scientists including Richard Turco and Carl Sagan as a potential result of widespread firestorms following a nuclear war. The fear was that post-nuclear firestorms could inject soot into the stratosphere, where it would block direct sunlight from reaching the surface of the Earth, causing a massive, and potentially deadly, global cooling effect. However, the early hypotheses were based on significant conjecture, and practical testing was needed to confirm or refute the original theories.

In 1986, Levine helped lead the first large-scale experiment to study the potential effects of smoke that might be generated in a nuclear war. The experiment was performed with the joint help of NASA, the United States Department of Defense, the University of Washington, the Defense Nuclear Agency, the Environmental Protection Agency and the U.S. Forest Service. It involved setting a large-scale controlled fire of 1,200 acres of chaparral vegetation within the 1,000-square-mile San Dimas Experimental Forest, in San Dimas, California, and carefully investigating the environmental impact of the resultant 10,000-foot plume of smoke that rose from the fire. The vegetation was already scheduled to be set on fire as part of a periodic "prescribed burn" by the Los Angeles County Fire Department, a local program to prune overgrowth in order to prevent uncontrolled forest fires.

The first test attempt was halted after a helicopter crashed just after the fire was ignited. According to The New York Times, a cable from the helicopter got snagged on a telephone wire, which caused it to lose control, and crash over 30 yards down a steep slope. The helicopter was completely destroyed in the process, and sent shards of metal into a nearby firetruck. The pilot, who was later identified as Gary Lineberry, crawled out and walked away, only suffering light scratches. Levine later told The New York Times that "the accident was unfortunate. It is a major logistics problem to bring all these groups together.''

Less than two weeks later, however, Levine and his team were able to complete the experiment successfully. A helicopter, piloted by NASA scientist Wesley Cofer III, flew in a 10-mile loop above the smoke at an altitude of about 65,000 feet, and carried a thermal scanner which measured the fire's intensity and the volume of particulate matter released. The results of the experiment helped provide a significant amount of useful data for scientists studying the possibility and potential harm of a future nuclear winter.

=== Preservation of the Declaration of Independence, the Constitution, and Bill of Rights ===
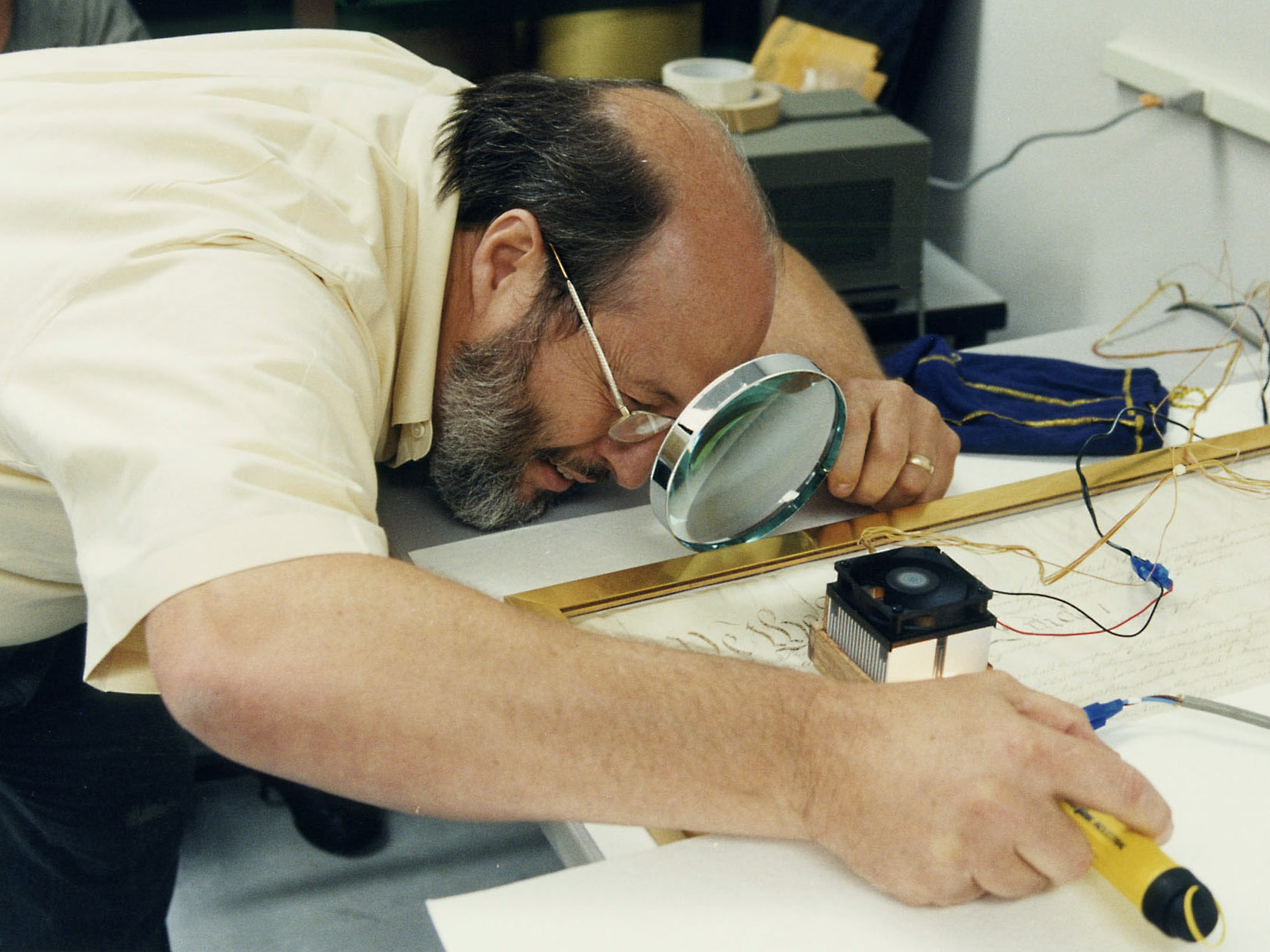
NASA Langley researcher James West looks for the first signs of water vapor condensation in the encasement of the U.S. Constitution.

In 1952, the Charters of Freedom were sealed in specially prepared airtight enclosures of tinted glass filled with humidified helium to protect the documents. However, in the late 1980s, archivists began to notice signs of deterioration in the Charters. Micro-droplets of liquid and tiny white crystals were forming (in a process known as crizzling) on the surface of the protective glass, and it was feared that they might continue growing if left unchecked, and that they could be a sign of unexpected moisture inside the enclosure.

In 1998, Levine was asked by the National Archives and Records Administration (NARA) to form and lead a team to identify the precise cause and origin of the crystals, without opening the encasements, if at all possible.

Levine's team presented their findings to NARA in 2002. They ultimately discovered that the helium atmosphere in the hermetically sealed encasements contained nearly twice as much water vapor than was previously believed. The elevated concentration of water vapor reacted with the encasement glass, resulting in the leaching of alkaline material from the surface material, which formed into the tiny white spots seen in the encasements. The cause for this increase in water vapor was eventually tracked back to the backing paper behind the documents, which had soaked up excess moisture on the day the Charters were originally sealed in the 1950s. Once the Charters were sealed, the backing paper slowly released the excess water vapor it had soaked up, causing the internal humidity to rise.

In 2002, in an effort to better preserve all three documents, the Charters of Freedom were removed from their original encasements and placed in newly constructed, hermetically sealed encasements in an argon atmosphere with a relative humidity of only 25 to 35%.

"The U.S. Constitution is one of the most important documents in the history of the world. It was an honor and a privilege to be asked to perform this research," said Levine. "We’re happy we were able to apply technology, originally developed at Langley for atmospheric science, remote sensing, laser spectroscopy and wind tunnel measurements, to ensure the future stability of the Charters of Freedom."

=== Role in rescue mission to save trapped miners ===
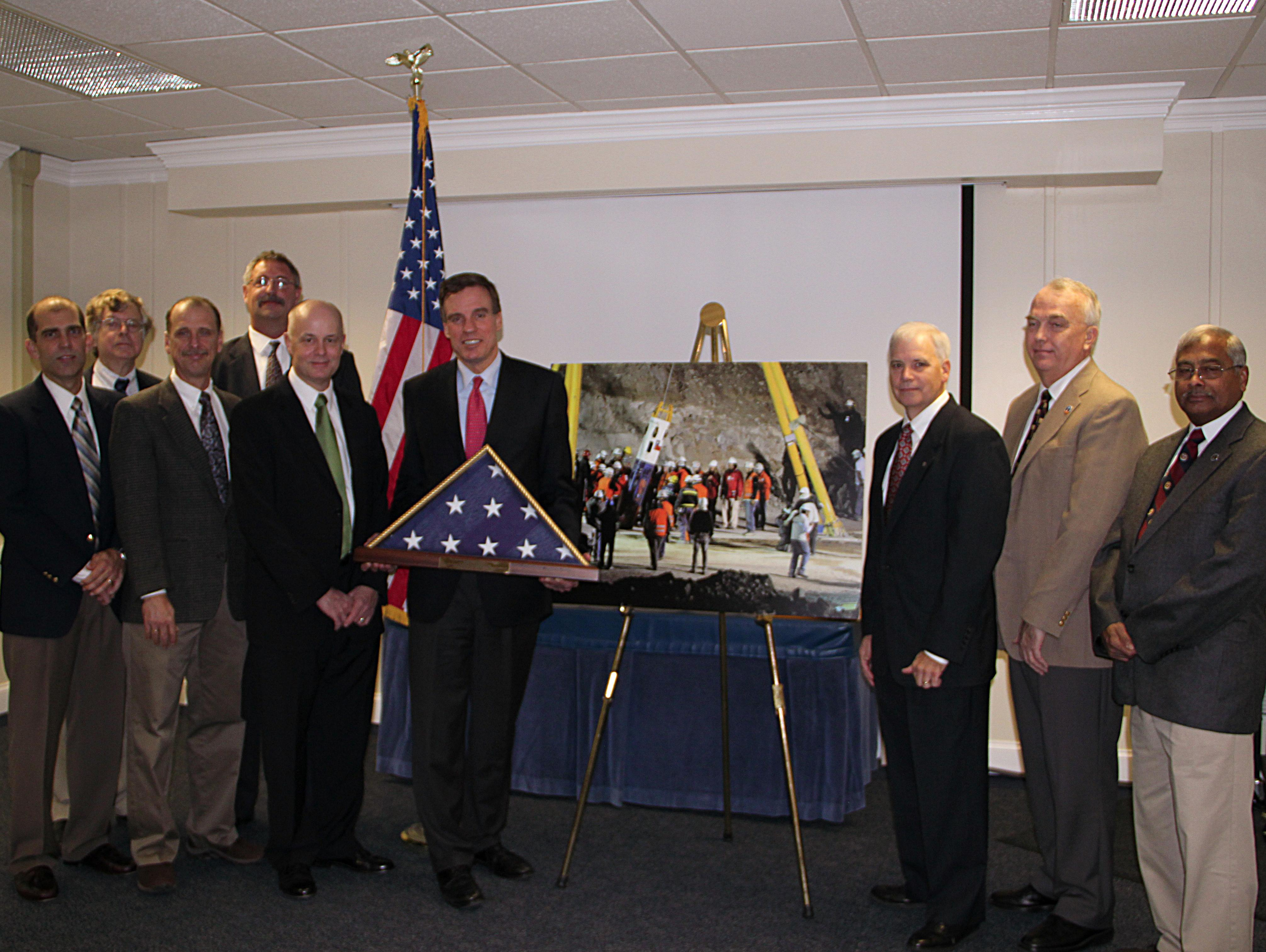
Senator Mark Warner (center) congratulating the Chilean Miners Rescue Support Team, including Levine (second-to-left)

On Thursday, August 5, 2010, a cave-in occurred at an active copper-gold mine in northern Chile, trapping thirty-three men 700 meters (2,300 feet) underground and 5 kilometers (3 miles) from the mine's entrance. An international rescue mission ensued, and on October 13, 2010, after 66 days underground, the men were winched up in a specially built capsule, as over 7.1 million people around the world watched the event live on TV. That capsule, the Fénix 2, was constructed by the Chilean Navy with design input from NASA.

Levine was brought in as a consultant for the rescue mission due to his unique experiences.

“I was working in my office at the NASA Langley Research Center in 2010 when the phone rang,” Levine said in an interview with the Virginia Gazette. “It was a call from the director of the NASA Engineering and Safety Center. He asked what do I know about gases in mines. I said, “Very little, but a great deal about gases on Mars!”

NASA needed to know if there would be any gas-related dangers to the miners as they were being carried up, if oxygen needed to be sent down with the capsule, and if the miners would need gas masks to survive the journey. Levine spent the next 24 hours studying the issue, and wrote a report to NASA outlining the concentration of gases the miners were expected to deal with, and concluded that there did not appear to be any likelihood of toxic gases present in the mine, and that it would be unnecessary to send down oxygen with the capsule. NASA engineers designed the Fénix 2 with Levine's help, and the rescue capsule was built and deployed by the Chilean Navy without issue. All 33 miners were saved and were found to be in good medical condition upon rescue.

== Public education, TV programs, and diversity initiative ==
In 1984–1986, WHRO-TV in Norfolk, Virginia partnered with NASA to produce a 32-lecture video series titled "Earth Science for Teachers." Levine served as organizer and coordinator of the atmospheric science series and appeared in eight 1-hour lectures. The series was televised nationally, and viewers were able to receive college credits for viewing at some universities. In 1986, Levine authored an article based on his lectures in the educational journal Science Activities titled "The Early Atmosphere: A New Picture," which became the lead article of the journal and formed the basis around which the rest of volume was written.

=== Diversity in NASA Space Program ===
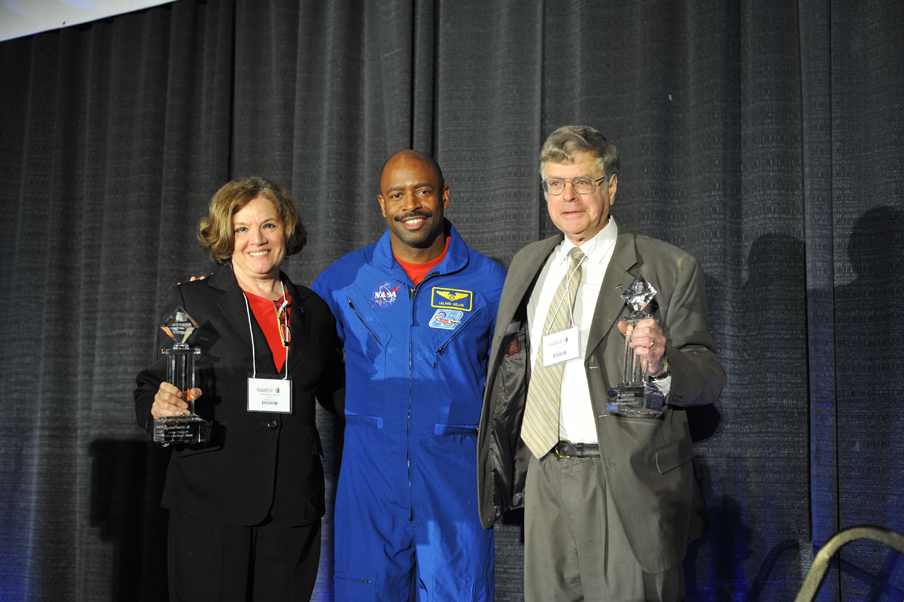
Astronaut Leland Melvin presents Arlene and Joel Levine with the National Alliance of Black School Educators Presidential Award.

In the early 2000s, Levine and his wife, Arlene Levine, began investigating what they determined to be a conspicuous lack of gender and racial diversity in the NASA space program, despite NASA's previously stated goal of hiring a more diverse workforce. After initial investigation, Arlene Levine determined that the education of black and minority students at the elementary school level had received lackluster attention from NASA. In 2004, in partnership with NASA and the National Alliance of Black School Educators (NABSE), the Levines created a series of interactive programs discussing topics in space science for use in schools across the country, to be shown monthly.

“We did that for six years,” Levine said. “I was the lecturer and she was the director. I spoke for 45 minutes and then we had questions transmitted back to us in the NASA studio live … and when we ran out of our 60 minutes, they would email them, and sometimes I would spend a day the next day answering questions.”

In addition to their educational work with NABSE, the Levines also helped develop a summer space science program for Native-American students living on reservations, in partnership with the American Indian Science and Engineering Society (AISES). On November 20, 2010, the Levines received the National Alliance of Black School Educators President's Award, which was presented to them by astronaut and personal friend Leland Melvin.

=== TED talks ===
In November 2009, Levine gave a TEDx NASA talk titled "Why we need to go back to Mars," which was viewed over 600,000 times as of August 6, 2017. In 2015, he was invited again, and gave a talk at TEDxRVA titled "The Exploration and Colonization of Mars by Humans: Why Mars? Why Humans?" which was based on a 2011 article published in The Atlantic by the same name.

== Personal life ==
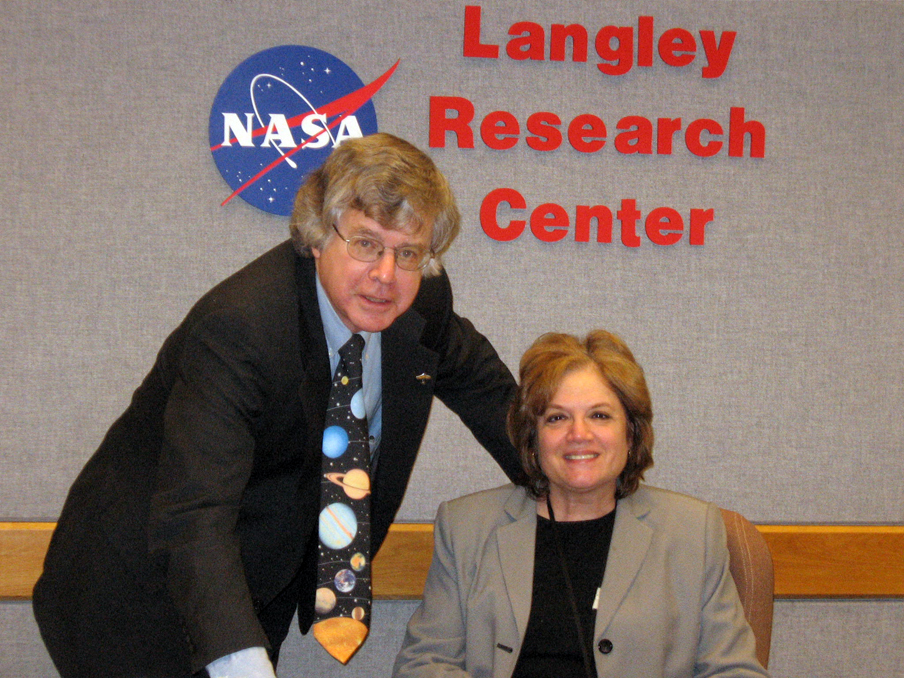
Joel and Arlene Levine

In 1968, Levine married Arlene Spielholz, and has a daughter and grandson. Arlene Levine worked at NASA for 27 years, studying the psychological effects of astronauts spending long time periods in space. The Levines retired on the same day on June 30, 2011, holding a joint retirement party. According to the Daily Press, Levine still has close ties to NASA since his retirement and is recognized as an expert on its history.

In 2017, Levine and his wife spoke about the history of women at NASA and their relationship with Mary Jackson at a special screening of Hidden Figures in Williamsburg, Virginia. Levine described Jackson as “Very friendly and outgoing, and very interested in helping her fellow employees, male and female and black and white. She was extremely helpful and always had a smile.” When asked at the event who had had the greatest influence on his career, Levine said: "Arlene, my wife of 50 years. She has always been very supportive of my career, its development and its demands." In 2020, Levine visited the Colchagua Museum in Chile, where the Fénix 2 capsule that he helped design is located.

== Honors ==
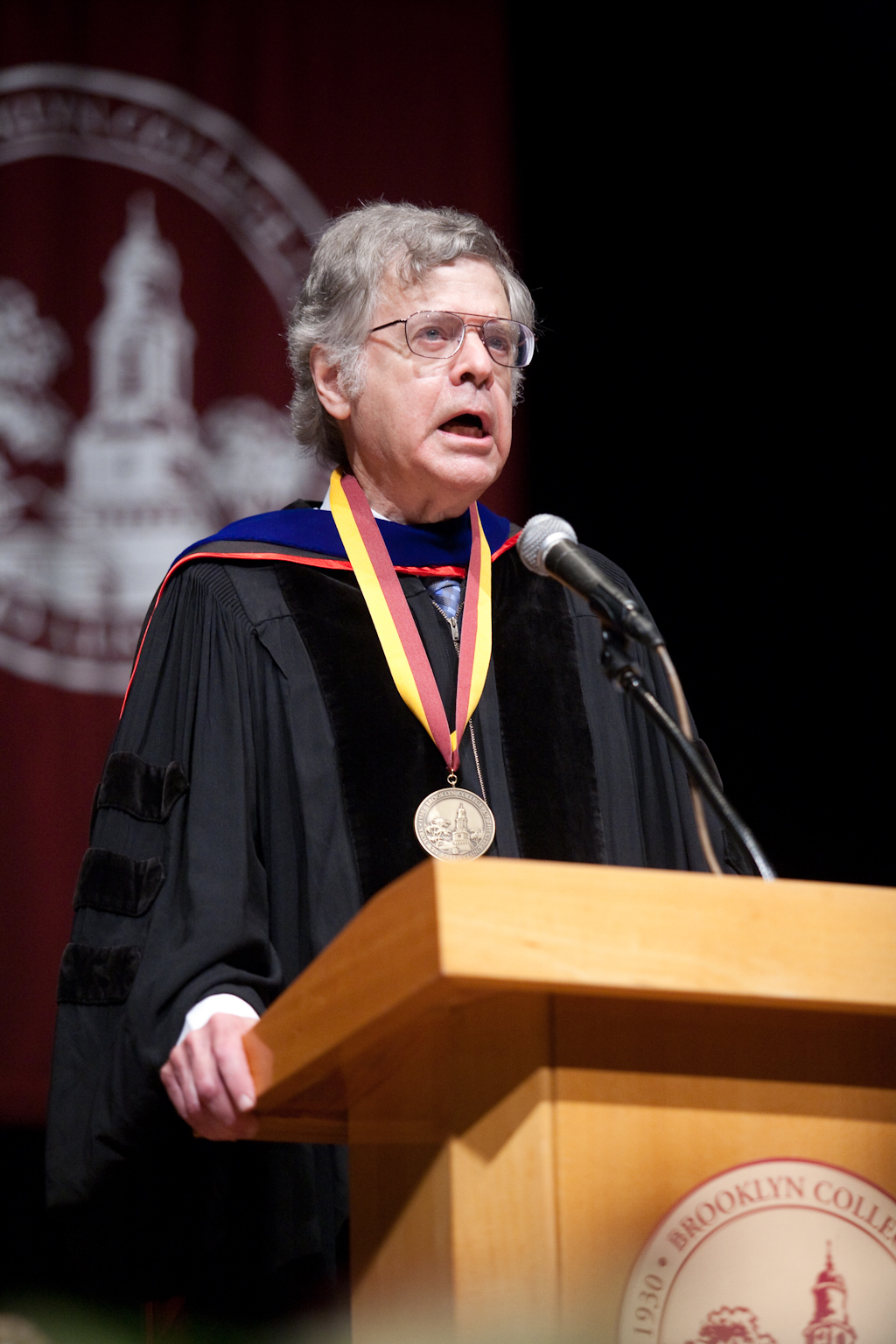
Levine receiving the Brooklyn College Distinguished Alumnus Award in 2011

- New York Academy of Sciences Halpern Award for Photochemistry (1982).
- NASA Exceptional Scientific Achievement Medal (1983).
- Virginia's Outstanding Scientist Award (1987).
- New York International Film and Television Festival Award for the Best Distance Learning Program (1994–1995).
- NASA Outstanding Leadership Medal (2006).
- University of Michigan College of Engineering Alumni Merit Award, Department of Atmospheric, Oceanographic and Space Sciences (2003).
- National Alliance of Black School Educators Presidential Award (2010).
- Brooklyn College Distinguished Alumni Award (2011).
- Induction into the NACA and NASA Langley Research Center Hall of Honor (2017).

== Select bibliography ==
=== Books ===
- Levine, J. S. (1985). The Photochemistry of Atmosphere: The Earth, The Other Planets, and Comets. Orlando, Florida: Academic Press, Inc. ISBN 978-0-12-444920-6.
- Levine, J. S. (1991). Global Biomass Burning: Atmospheric, Climatic, and Biospheric Implications. Cambridge, Massachusetts: The MIT Press. ISBN 9780262121590.
- Levine, J. S. (1996) Biomass Burning and Global Change, Volume 1. Remote Sensing, Modeling and Inventory Development, and Biomass Burning in Africa. The MIT Press. ISBN 9780262122016.
- Levine, J. S. (1996) Biomass Burning and Global Change, Volume 2. Burning in South America, Southeast Asia, and Temperate and Boreal Ecosystems, and the Oil Fires of Kuwait. The MIT Press. ISBN 9780262122023.
- Levine, J. S. and Rudy E. Schild. (2010) The Human Mission to Mars: Colonizing the Red Planet. Cosmology Science Publishers. ISBN 0982955235.
- Levine, J. S. et al. (2018) Dust in the Atmosphere of Mars and its Impact on Human Exploration. Cambridge Scholars Publishing. ISBN 1-5275-1172-3
- Levine, J. S. (2021) The Impact of Lunar Dust on Human Exploration. Cambridge Scholars Publishing. ISBN 1-5275-6308-1

=== Papers ===
- Anderson, Iris Cofman; Levine, Joel S. (May 1986). "Relative Rates of Nitric Oxide and Nitrous Oxide Production by Nitrifiers, Denitrifiers, and Nitrate Respirers". Applied and Environmental Microbiology. 51 (5): 938–945. Bibcode:1986ApEnM..51..938A. doi:10.1128/aem.51.5.938-945.1986. PMC 238991. PMID 16347068.
- Cahoon, Donald R.; Stocks, Brian J.; Levine, Joel S.; Cofer, Wesley R.; Pierson, Joseph M. (September 20, 1994). "Satellite analysis of the severe 1987 forest fires in northern China and southeastern Siberia". Journal of Geophysical Research: Atmospheres. 99 (D9): 18627–18638. Bibcode:1994JGR....9918627C. doi:10.1029/94JD01024. hdl:2060/20040139298.
- Cahoon, Donald R.; Stocks, Brian J.; Levine, Joel S.; Cofer, Wesley R.; O'Neill, Katherine P. (October 1992). "Seasonal distribution of African savanna fires". Nature. 359 (6398): 812–815. Bibcode:1992Natur.359..812C. doi:10.1038/359812a0. hdl:2060/20040139836. S2CID 4337134.
- Levine, Joel S.; Cofer, Wesley R.; Cahoon, Donald R.; Winstead, Edward L. (March 1995). "A Driver for Global Change". Environmental Science & Technology. 29 (3): 120A–125A. Bibcode:1995EnST...29..120L. doi:10.1021/es00003a746.
- Anderson, Iris Cofman; Levine, Joel S. (January 20, 1987). "Simultaneous field measurements of biogenic emissions of nitric oxide and nitrous oxide". Journal of Geophysical Research: Atmospheres. 92 (D1): 965–976. Bibcode:1987JGR....92..965A. doi:10.1029/JD092iD01p00965.
