= MELOS =

Proposed Mars rover by JAXA

- Names: Mars Explorations with Landers and Orbiters (2008); Mars Exploration of Life and Organism Search (2015)
- Mission type: Technology demonstrator
- Operator: JAXA
- Mission duration: Nominal: 68 sols Desired extension: 1 Mars year

Spacecraft properties
- Manufacturer: JAXA
- Landing mass: EDM (sky crane): 909 kg (2,004 lb); Rover: 150 kg (330 lb)
- Payload mass: 15 kg (33 lb)
- Power: Solar panels (1.5 m²); Battery: 720 Wh

Start of mission
- Launch date: 2024 (proposed)

Mars rover
- Landing date: 2025
- Landing site: Valles Marineris or Marte Vallis
- Distance driven: Goal: 50 km (31 mi)

MELOS (Mars Exploration of Life and Organism Search) is a Japanese rover mission concept under study for an engineering demonstration of precision landing, and to look for possible biosignatures on Mars using a rover. JAXA has not published updates since 2015.

== History ==
Japan's aerospace agency (JAXA) started to develop the mission concept on 2008, when MELOS stood for "Mars Explorations with Landers and Orbiters" or "Mars Exploration with Lander-Orbiter Synergy" which included several landers to be deployed simultaneously, that were to study meteorology and atmospheric gas escape. The first MELOS concept would have consisted of an orbiter and up to 4 small landers; all elements would be launched together on the same rocket. The orbiter would study the atmosphere, its and interactions with the solar wind, and image the current weather. Each of the four stationary landers would have been deployed on pre-determined landing sites and perform different measurements:

- Orbiter — Meteorology
- Lander A — Surface
- Lander B — Astrobiology —This lander would analyze soil near a methane vent. The proposed method is to use fluorochrome dye and a microscope to stain and scan for proteins and cellular membranes. The target sensitivity would be 10 cells / 1 g of soil (compared to 104 cells / 1 g in Earth desert). It would also detect other organic biosignatures or biomolecules.
- Lander C — Interior
- Lander D — Sample return

By 2015, MELOS was down-scaled to a rover mission for an engineering demonstration, and possibly an aircraft. Under the latest concept, MELOS stands for "Mars Exploration of Life and Organism Search".

== Rover ==
As of July 2015, the concept proposal includes a robotic rover whose primary objective is an engineering demonstration for long-range roving. Its secondary objective is science, specifically: meteorology, geology and astrobiology. The demonstration rover would use NASA's sky crane system for landing, and once on the surface, would deploy the MELOS rover.

=== Scientific objectives and payload ===
The scientific objectives of the mission include:

Meteorology

- Basic meteorological observations, dust devil observation and dust entrainment. Payload: thermometer, anemometer, barometer. Optional instruments include: a spectroscope for methane detection, a dust particle sensor, electromagnetic & sonic wave measurement of dust, and short range LIDAR.

Geology

- Geological description of the landing site including interior layered deposits and subsurface structure of regolith. Payload: ground penetrating radar (10-50m depth), multi-band stereo cameras (400-980 nm), VIS-NIR spectrometer (10ｰ20 nm). Optional: Geochronology Instrument (isochron dating method).

Astrobiology

- Identification of biosignatures (current life from Mars or Earth). Payload: sample arm, fluorescence microscope (using pigments to visualize living cells), and an optional "daughter rover" to access samples in difficult places.

== Aircraft ==
The mission concept also contemplates the optional deployment of a robotic airplane as a flight technology demonstrator. It would have a wing span of 1.2 m, mass of 2.1 kg and would be released at an altitude of 16,400 feet (5 km) during the entry and landing event. Its flight duration is estimated at 4 minutes, covering a distance of 25 km (16 mi). Its only scientific payload would be a camera.

== Proposed landing sites ==
The proposed landing sites will target 'wet' environments and include Valles Marineris (Melas Chasm and Juvantae Chasm), located near the confirmed recurring slope lineae, and Marte Vallis near dark slope streaks.

Since the mission aims for access to a "special region", strict planetary protection sterilization protocols must be followed to prevent forward contamination of Earth microbes to Mars.

== See also ==
- Astrobiology
- Akatsuki
- Life on Mars
- Nozomi - Mars flyby
