= NASA Mini-Sniffer =

NASA high-altitude research UAV

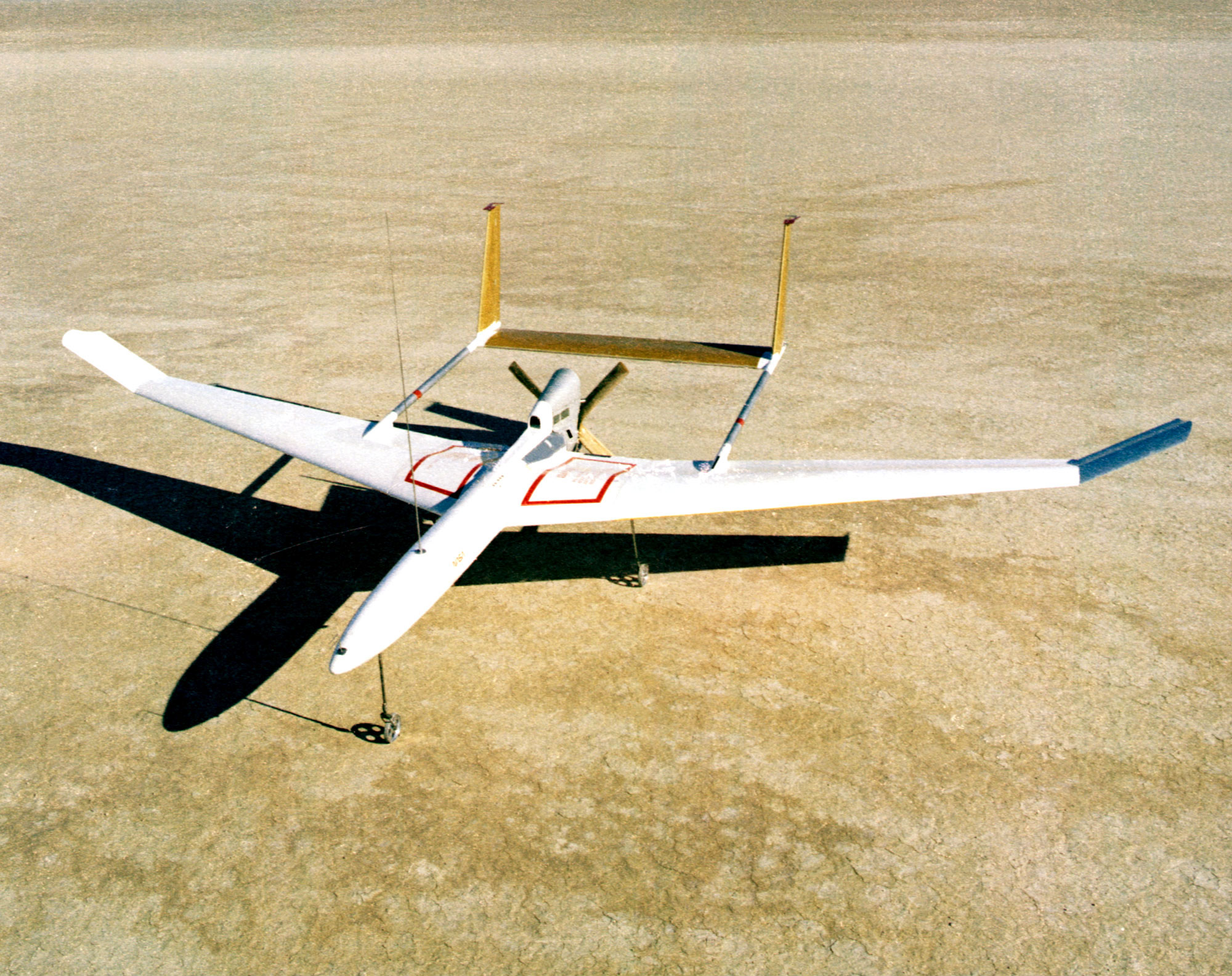
Mini-Sniffer III.

The NASA Mini-Sniffers were a series of unmanned aerial vehicles designed to sample the air at high altitude to support various scientific studies.

== History ==
In the early 1970s, NASA engineer Dale Reed was investigating methods for sampling the atmosphere at very high altitudes, up to 21 kilometers (70,000 feet). NASA's studies into supersonic transport jets had led to questions about their possible impact on the upper atmosphere, and Reed designed a series of "Mini-Sniffer" drones to take air samples at high altitudes. NASA also considered them for planetary atmospheric sampling flights over Mars. Three Mini-Sniffers were built by NASA Dryden Flight Research Center and were flown from 1975 through 1982.

== The aircraft ==
=== Mini-Sniffer I ===
The initial "Mini-Sniffer I" had a wingspan of 5.5 meters (18 feet), tailfins on the wingtips, and canards on the nose. It used a gasoline-powered piston engine and performed a dozen low-altitude flights to validate the design.

=== Mini-Sniffer II ===
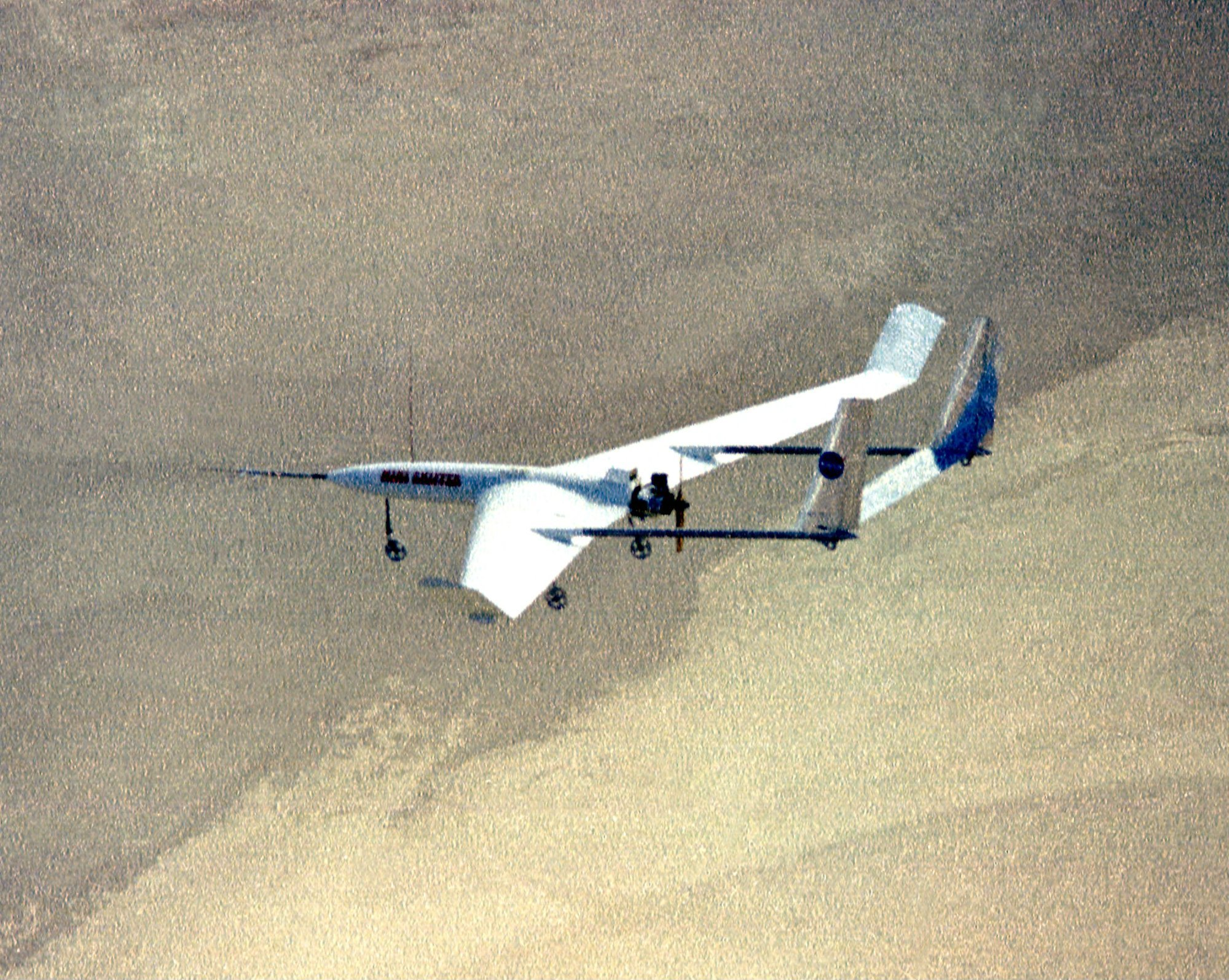
Mini-Sniffer II.

The Mini-Sniffer I was then modified into the "Mini-Sniffer II" by removing the canards and the wingtip tailfins, then adding tail booms and extending the wings, giving it a wingspan of 6.7 meters (22 feet). It was still powered by a gasoline engine, and made 21 flights to a maximum altitude of 6,100 meters (20,000 feet).

To get to much higher altitudes, Reed planned to use an unusual engine that burned hydrazine. A normal internal combustion engine burns gasoline with air to generate power, but at 21 kilometers the air is too thin to keep it running. Instead of gasoline, Reed planned to use hydrazine, or N_{2}H_{4}, which breaks down spontaneously when run across a catalyst, generating hot gas (ammonia, hydrogen and nitrogen) to drive the engine. Hydrazine is a corrosive, toxic, and unstable propellant, but its ability to "burn" without oxygen makes it useful for spacecraft thrusters and for such high-altitude engine applications.

=== Mini-Sniffer III ===
"Mini-Sniffer III" was a new build aircraft, similar to Mini-Sniffer II but with a longer fuselage and the hydrazine engine. Hydrazine was decomposed in a catalytic gas generator, made from converted spacecraft thruster. Hot gas drove the piston engine with 11.2 kW (15.0 hp) of power. The engine drove an electric alternator and a propeller through a 2:1 reduction drive. The flow of hot gas into the cylinder was regulated by a special poppet valve.

It was designed to carry an 11.3 kilogram (25 pound) payload to 70,000 feet (21,000 m) or higher. However, the Mini-Sniffer III only made a single flight to 6,100 meters (20,000 feet), and was not flown again because fuel leaks made it hazardous to handle. NASA lost interest in the idea, and the concept of a high-altitude UAV was abandoned until later when the NASA ERAST Program resurrected the idea.

== See also ==
- NASA ERAST Program
- NASA Pathfinder
- Mars aircraft
