= National Alliance of Black School Educators =

Non-profit organization

- Founded: November 20, 1970
- Founder: Dr. Charles Moody,
- Type: NGO
- Location: 310 Pennsylvania Avenue SE, Washington, DC 20003
- Origins: Washington, D.C.
- Region served: Worldwide
- President: Bernard Hamilton, Ed.D.
- Website: www.nabse.org

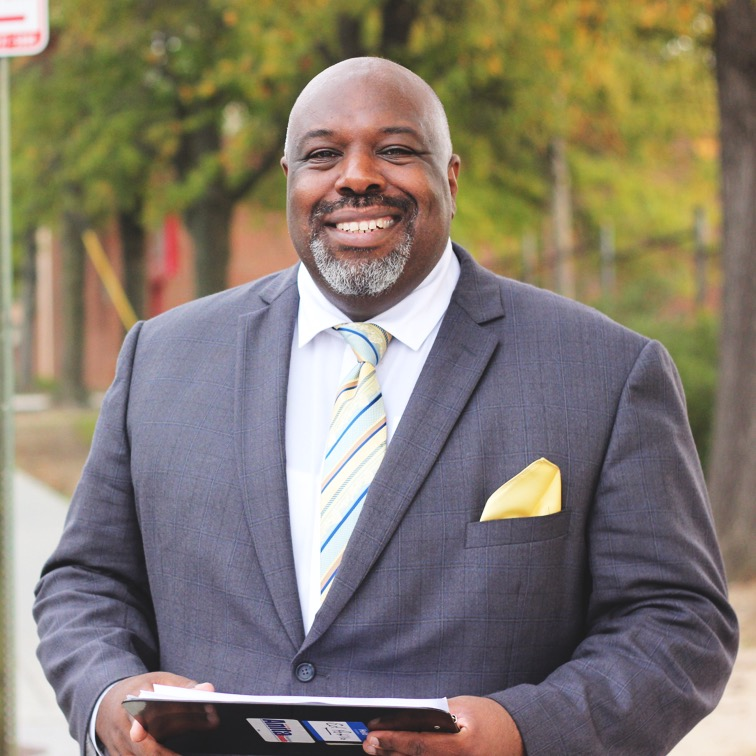
Ed Potillo

The National Alliance of Black School Educators (NABSE) is a non-profit organization that is devoted to furthering the academic success for the nation's children, especially those children of African ancestry. The NABSE was founded in 1970 and is the nation's largest network of African American educators program. The current conference and membership director is Ed Potillo. The organization reaches out to over 5,000 educators including teachers, administrators, superintendents and also other corporate and institutional members. The NABSE is dedicated to improving both the educational experiences and accomplishments of African American youth through the development and use of instructional and motivational methods that increase levels of inspiration, attendance and overall achievement. The NABSE promotes programs that deal with professional development, information-sharing on strategies that will help to motivate African American youth and increase their academic performances, and policy advocacy.

The NABSE seeks to promote and facilitate the education of all African American students. In order to complete this mission the NABSE has established a coalition of African American educators, administrators and other professionals that are both directly and indirectly involved in the educational system and process. They are also working to create a forum for the exchange of ideas and strategies to improve opportunities for African American educators and students. The NABSE has working programs in place to identify and develop African American professionals who will take on leadership positions in the educational system and influence public policy concerning the education of African Americans.

== History ==
On November 20, 1970, while completing a dissertation examining school systems led by Black superintendents, Dr. Charles D. Moody, Sr. invited several African-American superintendents to a meeting at the O'Hare Marriott Hotel in Chicago, Illinois, amongst them John Edgar Sydnor, superintendent of the Muskegon Heights School System in Muskegon, Michigan, and one of the longest serving Black superintendents in the country (having served from 1969-1990). The purpose of the meeting was to share concerns, develop a resource pool, and to form an organization of Black school superintendents. Representing the Metropolitan Applied Research Center (MARC), the organization that helped to fund the early meetings, were Hylan Lewis, Director of the Fellowship Program and Dixie Moon, Executive Administrator. Dr. Moody says, "When one is in a struggle or battle, he looks around to see if he is alone. This human characteristic was one of the underlying factors in the formation of the National Alliance of Black School Superintendents." Fifteen superintendents agreed forming an organization was a viable idea. Before that meeting was over in November 22, plans were made to meet again in August 1971 in Miami Beach, Florida. It was during the Miami meeting that the superintendents formally organized the National Alliance of Black School Superintendents (NABSS), with Dr. Russell Jackson elected its first president.

In 1972, the U.S. Department of Health, Education, and Welfare Office of Special Concern's Office of African-American Affairs awarded NABSS a grant to conduct an in-depth research study of 40 school districts headed by African-American superintendents. Dr. Meharry Lewis was the principal investigator for the grant. The study resulted in the development of a set of educational objectives for school districts enrolling predominantly African-American students.

On April 19, 1973, during the presidency of Ulysses Byas, NABSS voted to include administrators and other educational personnel in the organization and to change the organization's name to the National Alliance of Black School Educators (NABSE). Commissions that linked members with common and related job functions were formed. On November 23, 1973, in Detroit, Michigan, NABSE was formally launched with 284 charter members.

NABSE officially opened its first national office in Washington, D.C. on January 20, 1979. Dorothy Moore, on loan from the Detroit Public Schools, served as the first executive director. William Saunders was both office manager and executive director from 1983 to 1993.

Today, 100 NABSE affiliates throughout the United States, Canada, Europe, and the Caribbean perpetuate NABSE's legacy. Their activities include: local, state, and regional conferences; tutoring/coaching sessions; training programs; scholarships; newsletters; recognition programs; position papers; student trips; and monitoring local, state, and federal directives.

== Notable NABSE Achievements ==
NABSE effectively lobbied to secure government funding for the No Child Left behind act. NABSE's mission was to advocate for adequate federal financial support for the country's public education system. Affiliates are encouraged to allow students to express their thoughts and ideas, build relationships, and practice collaboration. The New Rochelle affiliate recently used Black History Month as a platform to create poetry, dance, songs and visual art to share their thoughts and ideas about the life, work and legacy of Dr. Maya Angelou. Each child's contribution will focus on celebrating the themes of freedom and empowerment that are epitomized in Dr. Angelou's poetry and spoken word.

To continue building upon the recent rise in graduation rates and boost parental involvement throughout Metro Nashville Public Schools, the National Alliance for Black School Educators (NABSE) and Promethean made an investment of more than $150,000 in interactive classroom technology and professional development to the Metro Nashville Public Schools. The donation was part of an annual program by NABSE and Promethean to close the achievement gap by modernizing classrooms and boosting parental engagement.

== NABSE Research ==
=== Is Special Education Really A Trap? ===
NABSE tested this hypothesis by comparing the rates that Black children who were classified as having "objective" medical disabilities as opposed to "subjective" psychological or intellectual problems. In a year when Black children were 14.8 percent of the school population, they constituted 14.6 percent of students with orthopedic difficulties, and 14.8 percent of those with visual impairments. However, they made up 34.3 percent of those labeled intellectually disabled and 26.4 percent of those labeled emotionally disturbed.

Other researchers, such as Dr. Mary M. Wagner of SRI International, find these comparisons unpersuasive. She argues that, because so many Black children are born into poverty, they experience high rates of low-weight births, homelessness and psychological trauma that would logically cause emotional and intellectual difficulties. In fact, the Association of Black Psychologists says that 14 percent of America's children are African-American, but that the percentage in foster care and/or awaiting adoption is 29 percent. Children usually wind up in foster care because their parents were abusive, neglectful, criminal or addicted, and 29 percent is close to the percentage in special education labeled "emotionally disturbed." In addition, the higher ratio of Black boys to girls in special education mirrors that of Whites.

The first two sets of academic skills may be being addressed in the nationwide push to improve primary and secondary education. Addressing the non-cognitive skills and college knowledge issues may be the key to success for 30 percent who don't apply or don't finish. The single most important factor might be better college advising in high school because NABSE, and affiliates, have found that the most qualified Black students often wind up going to less selective colleges than they could have attended.
