= Mars Aerial and Ground Global Intelligent Explorer =

Proposed Mars exploration aircraft

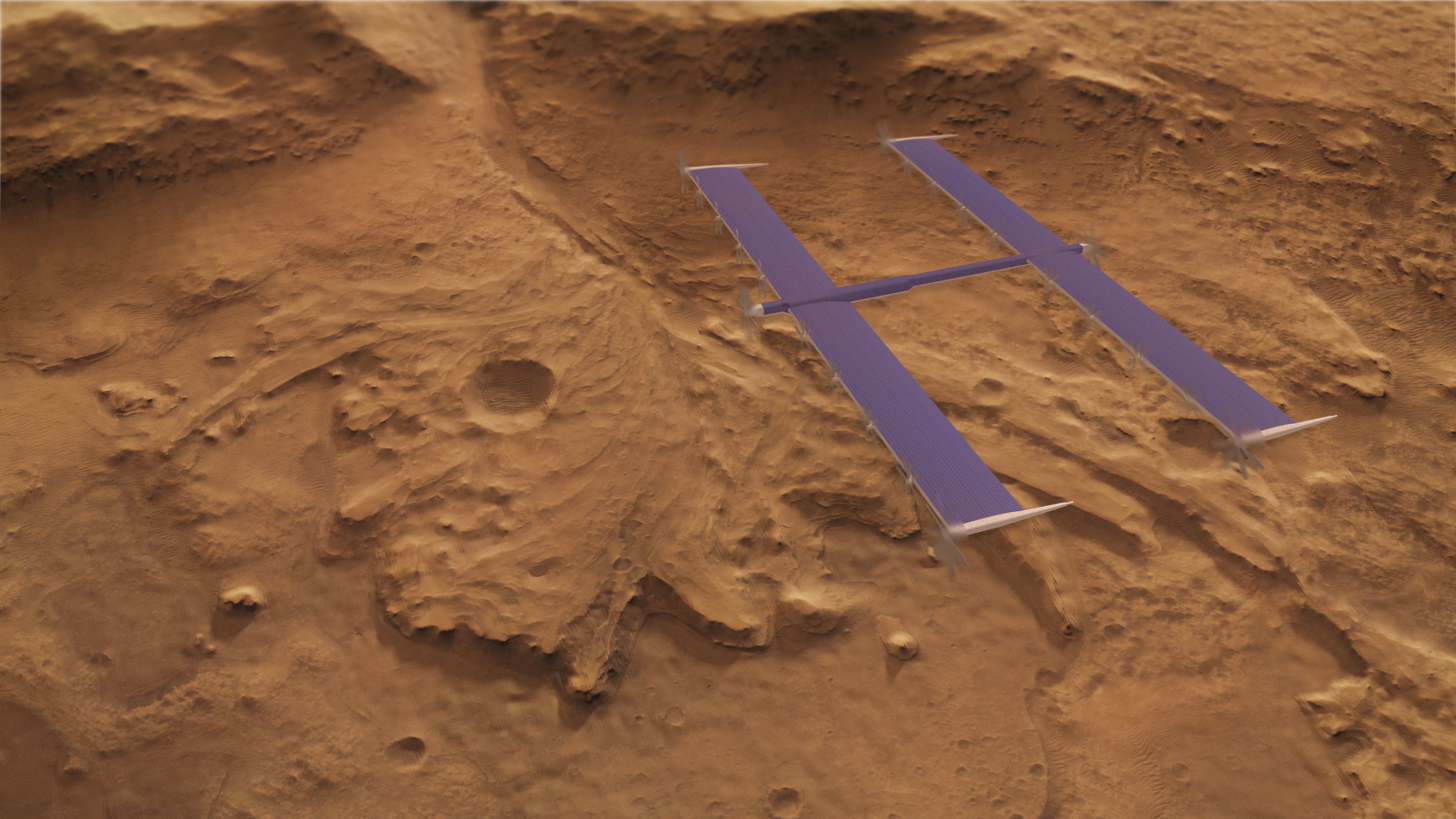
3D conceptual design of the Mars Aerial and Ground Global Intelligent Explorer (MAGGIE)

Mars Aerial and Ground Global Intelligent Explorer or MAGGIE is a proposed compact, autonomous, fixed wing, vertical take-off/landing (VTOL), electric aircraft powered by solar energy. It is designed to operate on Mars.

== Overview ==
Range with a fully charged battery would be 179 kilometres (111 mi) at an altitude of 1,000 meters. The aircraft features solar cells on its wings and fuselage. The total range per Martian year would be 16,048 kilometres (9,972 mi). Mars' atmosphere density is 6.35 mbar, 160x thinner than Earth's atmosphere at 1013.2 mbar. During the southern winter, the global atmospheric pressure on Mars is 25% lower than during summer, because some atmospheric CO_{2} freezes on the Martian polar ice caps. MAGGIE has a cruise lift coefficient CL of 3.5, nearly an order of magnitude higher than conventional subsonic aircraft, to overcome the low density of the Martian atmosphere. MAGGIE's cruise Mach number is 0.25. Mach speed on Mars is 546.4 miles per hour (879.3 km/h) at "sea level", so cruising speed would be around 130 miles per hour (210 km/h) at elevation.

== History ==
In January 2024, MAGGIE was one of thirteen proposals approved for Phase 1 funding by the NIAC.

== Missions ==
- Study Martian core dynamo origin and timing from the weak magnetic fields found in the large impact basins.
- Investigate the source of methane signals detected by the Tunable Laser Spectrometer on the Mars Science Laboratory in Gale crater.
- Map subsurface water ice at high resolution in the mid-latitudes.

== See also ==
- Aerobot
- Exploration of Mars
- Exploration geophysics
- Ingenuity helicopter
- Google Earth / Google Mars
- Mars aircraft
- NASA Institute for Advanced Concepts
- Solar-powered aircraft
- Mars Piloted Orbital Station
