= Mars Piloted Orbital Station =

Russian concept for an orbital human mission to Mars

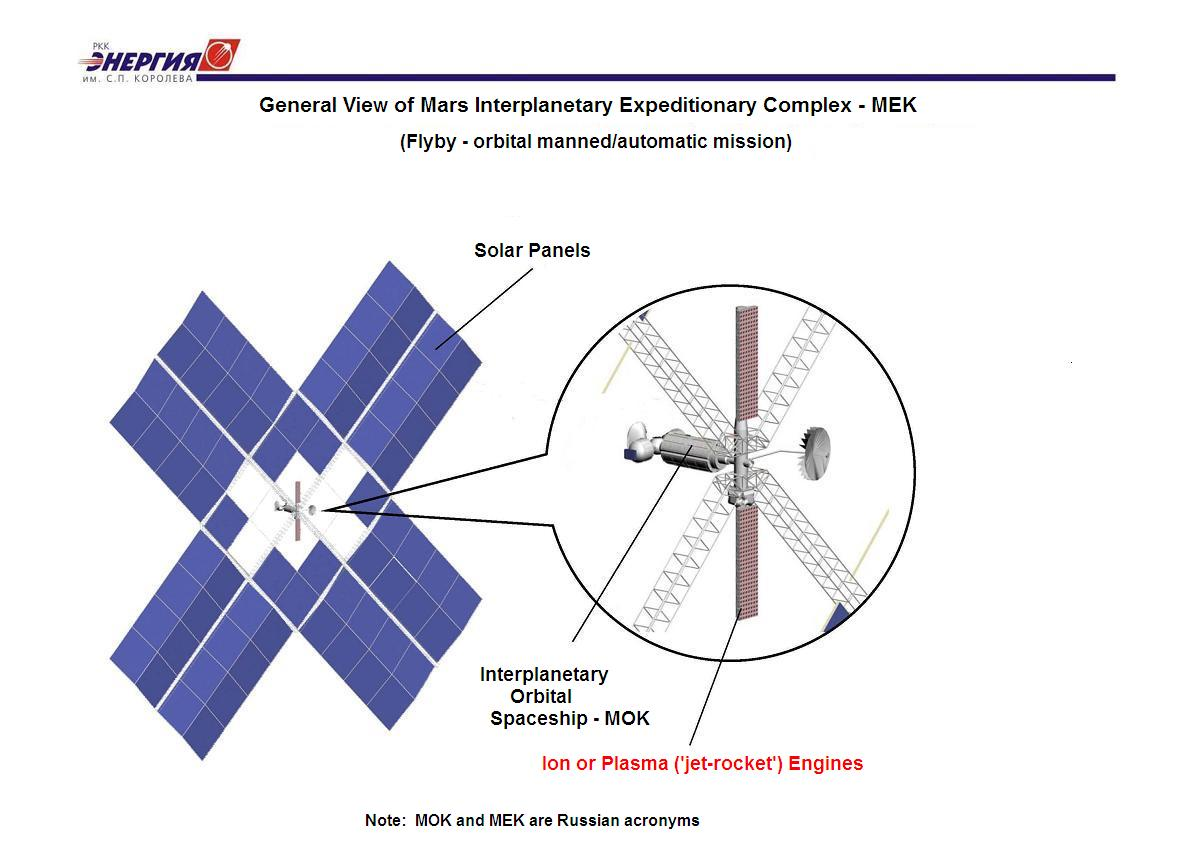
Diagram of MEK, one of the proposed concepts.

Mars Piloted Orbital Station (or Marspost) is a Russian concept for an orbital human mission to Mars, with several proposed configurations, including using a nuclear reactor to run an electric rocket engine. A 30-volume draft proposal was produced in 2005. The design for the proposed ship was proposed to be ready in 2012, and the ship itself in 2021. The concept did not undergo detailed design nor development.

== Mission scenario ==
Marpost would be launched to Mars together with a fleet of robotic spacecraft designed to study the planet both from its orbit and on its surface, while the crew would remain in Mars orbit. The station would reach Mars orbit from where its crew would research Mars by operating the robots; for this reason the mission is called a 'hybrid'.

Since the robots would be controlled by Marpost crewmembers from Martian orbit it would eliminate one of the basic problems of robotic Mars missions, the 4 to 24 minute delay for radio signals to reach the Earth. Samples of Martian soil would then be delivered by these robots to Marpost and later brought back to Earth. The whole duration of the flight would be 2.5 years with one month of work in Mars orbit. The mission would also investigate if people can survive a lengthy trip through deep space and effectively perform their tasks.

== Evolution of the concept ==
The idea of this 'hybrid' mission was first advanced by Yuri Karash. His article was published in the Russian Nezavisimaya Gazeta on October 18, 2000 under the title Vperyod, Na Mars! Rossii sleduyet vzyat kurs na sozdaniye marsianskoi pilotiruemoy orbitalnoy stantsii [Onward, to Mars! Russia needs to set a course toward the development of a Martian Piloted Orbital Station]. Karash claimed that Russia, while continuing its participation in the International Space Station program, should build the rest of Russian modules for the station but instead of attaching them to the ISS, assemble them in orbit as an autonomous complex and launch it to Mars with a crew on board. He also gave this space complex its name Marspost.

Further concepts see Marpost to pave the way for a joint Russian-American mission to the Martian surface. Russia, capitalizing on its extensive experience in building and operating long-term orbital space stations, would build a trans-planetary spacecraft while America, capitalizing on its experience gained during the Apollo Moon landing program, would build a Mars landing module.

The idea of Marpost was then picked up by Leonid Gorshkov, one of the main designers of the RKK Energia (Raketno-Kosmicheskaya Korporatsiya – Rocket-Space Corporation) company, the leading Russian space developer and builder of human spaceflight hardware. Gorshkov proposed to use the space complex called MEK (Mezhplanetniy Ekspeditsioniy Komplex, or Interplanetary Expeditionary Complex), that was already developed and designed by RKK Energia. The projected cost would be $14–16 billion and the period of realization would be 12–14 years. The elements of MEK were initially proposed to be launched by the Energia heavy booster. Later however, in order to lower the cost of the mission, the elements of MEK were proposed to be launched by a Proton or Angara rocket. The overall mass of MEK is estimated at 400 tons. The flight from Earth orbit to Mars would be powered by ion thruster engines.

== See also ==
- Russian Federal Space Agency
- Mars Aerial and Ground Global Intelligent Explorer (MAGGIE)
- Mars aircraft
