= List of missions to Mars =

This is a list of spacecraft missions (including unsuccessful ones) to the planet Mars, such as orbiters, landers, and rovers. Mission time is often measured in Mars sols, solar days on Mars.

== Missions ==
Mission Type Legend
Mission to Mars
Gravity assist, destination elsewhere

Mission		Launch date	Operator	Carrier rocket	Spacecraft	Mission type	Outcome
1	1M No.1	10 October 1960	(Soviet Union) OKB-1	Molniya	1M No.1	Flyby	Launch failure
1	1M No.1	Failed to achieve Earth orbit.					
2	1M No.2	14 October 1960	(Soviet Union) OKB-1	Molniya	1M No.2	Flyby	Launch failure
2	1M No.2	Failed to achieve Earth orbit.					
3	2MV-4 No.1	24 October 1962	Soviet Union	Molniya	2MV-4 No.1	Flyby	Launch failure
3	2MV-4 No.1	Booster stage ("Block L") disintegrated in LEO.					
4	Mars 1	1 November 1962	Soviet Union	Molniya	2MV-4 No.2	Flyby	Spacecraft failure
4	Mars 1	Communications lost before first flyby.					
5	2MV-3 No.1	4 November 1962	Soviet Union	Molniya	2MV-3 No.1	Lander	Launch failure
5	2MV-3 No.1	Never left Low Earth orbit.					
6	Mariner 3	5 November 1964	(United States) NASA	Atlas LV-3 Agena-D	Mariner 3	Flyby	Launch failure
6	Mariner 3	Payload fairing failed to separate.					
7	Mariner 4	28 November 1964	(United States) NASA	Atlas LV-3 Agena-D	Mariner 4	Flyby	Success
7	Mariner 4	First successful flyby of Mars on 15 July 1965.					
8	Zond 2	30 November 1964	Soviet Union	Molniya	3MV-4A No.2	Flyby	Spacecraft failure
8	Zond 2	Communications lost before flyby.					
9	Mariner 6	25 February 1969	(United States) NASA	Atlas SLV-3C Centaur-D	Mariner 6	Flyby	Success
9	Mariner 6	Part of a dual mission to Mars along with Mariner 7.					
10	2M No.521	27 March 1969	Soviet Union	Proton-K / D	1969A	Orbiter	Launch failure
10	2M No.521	Failed to achieve Earth orbit.					
11	Mariner 7	27 March 1969	(United States) NASA	Atlas SLV-3C Centaur-D	Mariner 7	Flyby	Success
11	Mariner 7	Part of a dual mission to Mars along with Mariner 6. Closest approach to Mars was five days after Mariner 6.					
12	2M No.522	2 April 1969	Soviet Union	Proton-K / D	1969B	Orbiter	Launch failure
12	2M No.522	Failed to achieve Earth orbit.					
13	Mariner 8	9 May 1971	(United States) NASA	Atlas SLV-3C Centaur-D	Mariner 8	Orbiter	Launch failure
13	Mariner 8	Failed to achieve Earth orbit.					
14	Kosmos 419	10 May 1971	Soviet Union	Proton-K / D	3MS No.170	Orbiter	Launch failure
14	Kosmos 419	Never left Low Earth orbit; booster stage burn timer set incorrectly.					
15	Mars 2	19 May 1971	Soviet Union	Proton-K / D	4M No.171	Orbiter	Success
15	Mars 2	19 May 1971	Soviet Union	Proton-K / D	SA 4M No.171	Lander	Spacecraft failure
15	Mars 2	19 May 1971	Soviet Union	Proton-K / D	PrOP-M	Rover	Precluded
15	Mars 2	On November 27, the Mars 2 Orbiter became in short sequence the second spacecraft to orbit another planet. The lander became the first human-made object to impact Mars. Deployed from Mars 2, failed to land during attempt on 27 November 1971. Operated for 362 orbits PrOP-M was the first rover launched to Mars. Lost when the Mars 2 lander crashed into the surface of Mars.					
16	Mars 3	28 May 1971	Soviet Union	Proton-K / D	4M No.172	Orbiter	Success
16	Mars 3	28 May 1971	Soviet Union	Proton-K / D	SA 4M No.172	Lander	Partial failure
16	Mars 3	28 May 1971	Soviet Union	Proton-K / D	PrOP-M	Rover	Precluded
16	Mars 3	On December 2, it became in short sequence the third spacecraft to orbit another planet. Operated for 20 orbits. Mars 3 Lander was the first lander to make a soft landing on Mars on 2 December 1971. First partial image (70 lines) transmitted showing "gray background with no details". Contact lost 20 seconds after transmission started, 110 seconds after landing. PrOP-M was the first rover to make a soft landing on another planet. 4.5 kg (9.9 lb) rover connected to the Mars 3 lander by a tether. Deployment status unknown due to loss of communications with the Mars 3 lander.					
17	Mariner 9	30 May 1971	(United States) NASA	Atlas SLV-3C Centaur-D	Mariner 9	Orbiter	Success
17	Mariner 9	First spacecraft to orbit another planet, two weeks ahead of Mars 2 on November 14. Deactivated 516 days after entering orbit.					
18	Mars 4	21 July 1973	Soviet Union	Proton-K / D	3MS No.52S	Orbiter	Partial failure
18	Mars 4	Failed to perform orbital insertion burn. Returned photographs of Mars during flyby.					
19	Mars 5	25 July 1973	Soviet Union	Proton-K / D	3MS No.52S	Orbiter	Success
19	Mars 5	Contact lost after 9 days in Mars orbit. Returned 180 frames.					
20	Mars 6	5 August 1973	Soviet Union	Proton-K / D	3MS No.50P	Orbiter	Success
20	Mars 6	5 August 1973	Soviet Union	Proton-K / D	Mars 6 lander	Lander	Spacecraft failure
20	Mars 6	Flyby bus collected data. Contact lost upon landing, atmospheric data mostly unusable.					
21	Mars 7	9 August 1973	Soviet Union	Proton-K / D	3MP No.51P	Flyby	Success
21	Mars 7	9 August 1973	Soviet Union	Proton-K / D	Mars 7 lander	Lander	Spacecraft failure
21	Mars 7	Flyby bus collected data. Lander separated from coast stage prematurely, failed to enter Martian atmosphere.					
22	Viking 1	20 August 1975	(United States) NASA	Titan IIIE Centaur-D1T	Viking 1 orbiter	Orbiter	Success
22	Viking 1	20 August 1975	(United States) NASA	Titan IIIE Centaur-D1T	Viking 1 lander	Lander	Success
22	Viking 1	Entered Mars orbit on 19 June 1976 and operated until 1385 orbits. Viking 1 lander was the First successful Mars lander. Deployed from Viking 1 orbiter. Landed on Mars on 20 July 1976. Operated for 2245 sols.					
23	Viking 2	9 September 1975	(United States) NASA	Titan IIIE Centaur-D1T	Viking 2 orbiter	Orbiter	Success
23	Viking 2	9 September 1975	(United States) NASA	Titan IIIE Centaur-D1T	Viking 2 lander	Lander	Success
23	Viking 2	Operated for 700 orbits. Entered Mars orbit on 7 August 1976. Viking 2 lander was deployed from Viking 2 orbiter. Landed on Mars in September 1976. Operated for 1281 sols (11 April 1980).					
24	Phobos 1	7 July 1988	Soviet Union	Proton-K / D-2	1F No.101	Orbiter	Spacecraft failure
24	Phobos 1	7 July 1988	Soviet Union	Proton-K / D-2	DAS	Lander (Phobos)	Precluded
24	Phobos 1	Communications lost before reaching Mars; failed to enter orbit. Phobos lander was to have been deployed by the spacecraft.					
25	Phobos 2	12 July 1988	Soviet Union	Proton-K / D-2	1F No.102	Orbiter	Mostly successful
25	Phobos 2	12 July 1988	Soviet Union	Proton-K / D-2	DAS	Lander (Phobos)	Precluded
25	Phobos 2	12 July 1988	Soviet Union	Proton-K / D-2	Prop-F	Rover (Phobos)	Precluded
25	Phobos 2	Orbital observations successful, communications lost before lander and rover deployment.					
26	Mars Observer	25 September 1992	(United States) NASA	Commercial Titan III	Mars Observer	Orbiter	Spacecraft failure
26	Mars Observer	Lost communications before orbital insertion.					
27	Mars Global Surveyor	7 November 1996	(United States) NASA	Delta II 7925	Mars Global Surveyor	Orbiter	Success
27	Mars Global Surveyor	Operated for ten years.					
28	Mars 96	16 November 1996	(Russia) Roscosmos	Proton-K / D-2	M1 No.520(Mars-8)	Orbiter	Launch failure
28	Mars 96	16 November 1996	(Russia) Roscosmos	Proton-K / D-2	Mars 96 lander (A)	Lander	Precluded
28	Mars 96	16 November 1996	(Russia) Roscosmos	Proton-K / D-2	Mars 96 lander (B)	Lander	Precluded
28	Mars 96	16 November 1996	(Russia) Roscosmos	Proton-K / D-2	Mars 96 penetrator (A)	Penetrator	Precluded
28	Mars 96	16 November 1996	(Russia) Roscosmos	Proton-K / D-2	Mars 96 penetrator (B)	Penetrator	Precluded
28	Mars 96	Never left Low Earth orbit. Two small landers and penetrators were to have been deployed by the Mars 96 orbiter.					
29	Mars Pathfinder	4 December 1996	(United States) NASA	Delta II 7925	Mars Pathfinder	Lander	Success
29	Mars Pathfinder	4 December 1996	(United States) NASA	Delta II 7925	Sojourner	Rover	Success
29	Mars Pathfinder	Landed at 19.13°N 33.22°W on 4 July 1997, last contact on 27 September 1997. Sojourner was the first rover to operate on another planet. Operated for 84 days					
30	Nozomi	3 July 1998	(Japan) ISAS	M-V	PLANET-B	Orbiter	Spacecraft failure
30	Nozomi	Performed a Mars flyby. Later contact lost due to loss of fuel. However provided crucial information about the deep space environment.					
31	Mars Surveyor '98 Orbiter	11 December 1998	(United States) NASA	Delta II 7425	Mars Climate Orbiter	Orbiter	Spacecraft failure
31	Mars Surveyor '98 Orbiter	Approached Mars too closely during orbit insertion attempt due to a software interface bug involving different units for impulse and either burned up in the atmosphere or entered solar orbit.					
32	Mars Surveyor '98 Lander	3 January 1999	(United States) NASA	Delta II 7425	Mars Polar Lander	Lander	Spacecraft failure
32	Mars Surveyor '98 Lander	3 January 1999	(United States) NASA	Delta II 7425	Deep Space 2 (A)	Penetrator	Spacecraft failure
32	Mars Surveyor '98 Lander	3 January 1999	(United States) NASA	Delta II 7425	Deep Space 2 (B)	Penetrator	Spacecraft failure
32	Mars Surveyor '98 Lander	Failed to function after landing. No data transmitted from Deep Space 2 after deployment from MPL.					
33	2001 Mars Odyssey	7 April 2001	(United States) NASA	Delta II 7925	Mars Odyssey	Orbiter	Operational
33	2001 Mars Odyssey	Was expected to remain operational until 2025. Operational as of 14 November 2026.					
34	Mars Express	2 June 2003	ESA	Soyuz-FG / Fregat	Mars Express Orbiter	Orbiter	Operational
34	Mars Express	2 June 2003	ESA	Soyuz-FG / Fregat	Beagle 2	Lander	Spacecraft failure
34	Mars Express	Enough fuel to remain operational until 2035. No communications received after release from Mars Express. Orbital images of landing site suggest a successful landing, but two solar panels failed to deploy, obstructing its communications.					
35	Spirit	10 June 2003	(United States) NASA	Delta II 7925	Spirit (MER-A)	Rover	Success
35	Spirit	Landed on 4 January 2004. Operated for 2208 sols.					
36	Opportunity	8 July 2003	(United States) NASA	Delta II 7925H	Opportunity (MER-B)	Rover	Success
36	Opportunity	Landed on 25 January 2004. Operated for 5351 sols.					
–	Cornerstone 9	2 March 2004	ESA	Ariane 5G+	Rosetta	Flyby (Gravity assist)	Success
–	Cornerstone 9	2 March 2004	ESA	Ariane 5G+	Philae	Flyby (Gravity assist)	Success
–	Cornerstone 9	Flyby in February 2007 en route to 67P/Churyumov–Gerasimenko.					
37	Mars Reconnaissance Orbiter	12 August 2005	(United States) NASA	Atlas V 401	Mars Reconnaissance Orbiter	Orbiter	Operational
37	Mars Reconnaissance Orbiter	Entered orbit on 10 March 2006.					
38	Phoenix	4 August 2007	(United States) NASA	Delta II 7925	Phoenix	Lander	Success
38	Phoenix	Landed on 25 May 2008. End of mission 2 November 2008.					
–	Dawn	27 September 2007	(United States) NASA	Delta II 7925H	Dawn	Flyby (Gravity assist)	Success
–	Dawn	Flyby in February 2009 en route to 4 Vesta and Ceres.					
39	China-Russia joint Mars mission	8 November 2011	(Russia) Roscosmos	Zenit-2M	Fobos-Grunt	Sample return (Phobos)	Launch failure
39	China-Russia joint Mars mission	8 November 2011	(China) CNSA	Zenit-2M	Yinghuo-1	Orbiter	Precluded
39	China-Russia joint Mars mission	Never left Low Earth orbit (intended to depart under own power). Yinghuo-1 was to have been deployed by Fobos-Grunt.					
40	Mars Science Laboratory	26 November 2011	(United States) NASA	Atlas V 541	Curiosity	Rover	Operational
40	Mars Science Laboratory	Landed on 6 August 2012.					
41	Mars Orbiter Mission	5 November 2013	(India) ISRO	PSLV-XL	MOM	Orbiter	Success
41	Mars Orbiter Mission	Entered orbit on 24 September 2014. Mission extended to 2022, where the mission concluded on September 27, 2022, after contact was lost.					
42	MAVEN	18 November 2013	(United States) NASA	Atlas V 401	MAVEN	Orbiter	Success
42	MAVEN	Orbit insertion on 22 September 2014. Last contact on 6 December 2025.					
43	ExoMars	14 March 2016	(Russia) Roscosmos / ESA	Proton-M / Briz-M	Trace Gas Orbiter	Orbiter	Operational
43	ExoMars	14 March 2016	ESA	Proton-M / Briz-M	Schiaparelli EDM	Lander	Spacecraft failure
43	ExoMars	Entered orbit on 19 October 2016. Schiaparelli EDM lander was Carried by the Orbiter. Although the lander crashed, engineering data on the first five minutes of entry was successfully retrieved.					
44	Discovery 12	5 May 2018	(United States) NASA	Atlas V 401	InSight	Lander	Success
44	Discovery 12	5 May 2018	(United States) NASA	Atlas V 401	MarCO-A	Flyby	Success
44	Discovery 12	5 May 2018	(United States) NASA	Atlas V 401	MarCO-B	Flyby	Success
44	Discovery 12	InSight landed on 26 November 2018. Last contact 15 December 2022. MarCO A and B relay cubesats which were used to test communications, flew by Mars on 26 November 2018 with last contact on 4 January 2019.					
45	Emirates Mars Mission	19 July 2020	(United Arab Emirates) MBRSC	H-IIA	Hope	Orbiter	Operational
45	Emirates Mars Mission	Entered orbit on 9 February 2021.					
46	Tianwen-1	23 July 2020	(China) CNSA	Long March 5	Tianwen-1 orbiter	Orbiter	Operational
46	Tianwen-1	23 July 2020	(China) CNSA	Long March 5	Tianwen-1 lander	Lander	Success
46	Tianwen-1	23 July 2020	(China) CNSA	Long March 5	Zhurong	Rover	Success
46	Tianwen-1	23 July 2020	(China) CNSA	Long March 5	Tianwen-1 Remote Camera	Camera	Success
46	Tianwen-1	23 July 2020	(China) CNSA	Long March 5	Tianwen-1 Deployable Camera 2	Camera	Success
46	Tianwen-1	Entered orbit on 10 February 2021. Tianwen-1 lander landed on 14 May 2021 and deployed Zhurong rover. Rover became inactive on 20 May 2022. Remote Camera was deployed by the Tianwen-1 lander on 22 May 2021. Deployable Camera 2 entered orbit on 10 February 2021, deployed 31 December 2021.					
47	Mars 2020	30 July 2020	(United States) NASA	Atlas V 541	Perseverance	Rover	Operational
47	Mars 2020	30 July 2020	(United States) NASA	Atlas V 541	Ingenuity	Helicopter	Success
47	Mars 2020	Landed on 18 February 2021. Ingenuity took the first aerodynamic flight on another planet. Landed with Perseverance rover on 18 February 2021. Deployed from rover on 3 April 2021. First flight achieved on 3 April 2021. Retired on 25 January 2024 due to sustained rotor blade damage.					
–	Discovery 14	13 October 2023	(United States) NASA	Falcon Heavy	Psyche	Flyby (Gravity assist)	Success
–	Discovery 14	Gravity assist en route to 16 Psyche in May 2026					
–	S2P	7 October 2024	ESA	Falcon 9	Hera	Flyby (Gravity assist)	Success
–	S2P	Flyby in March 2025 en route to 65803 Didymos.					
–	Europa Clipper	14 October 2024	(United States) NASA	Falcon Heavy	Europa Clipper	Flyby (Gravity assist)	Success
–	Europa Clipper	Flyby in March 2025 en route to Jupiter and Europa.					
48	ESCAPADE	13 November 2025	(United States) NASA / UC Berkeley	New Glenn	ESCAPADE Blue	Orbiter	Enroute
48	ESCAPADE	13 November 2025	(United States) NASA / UC Berkeley	New Glenn	ESCAPADE Gold	Orbiter	Enroute
48	ESCAPADE	Twin spacecraft; Mars orbit insertion expected in September 2027.					
49	Martian Moons eXploration (MMX)	19 October 2026	(Japan) JAXA	H3-24L	MMX	Orbiter / Sample return	Enroute
49	Martian Moons eXploration (MMX)	19 October 2026	(Japan) JAXA	H3-24L	IDEFIX	Rover	Enroute
49	Martian Moons eXploration (MMX)	Japanese robotic mission led by JAXA to explore Phobos and Deimos. Carries the IDEFIX rover, developed by CNES and DLR. The mission aims to take samples from Phobos and return them to the Earth in 2031.					

== Landing locations ==
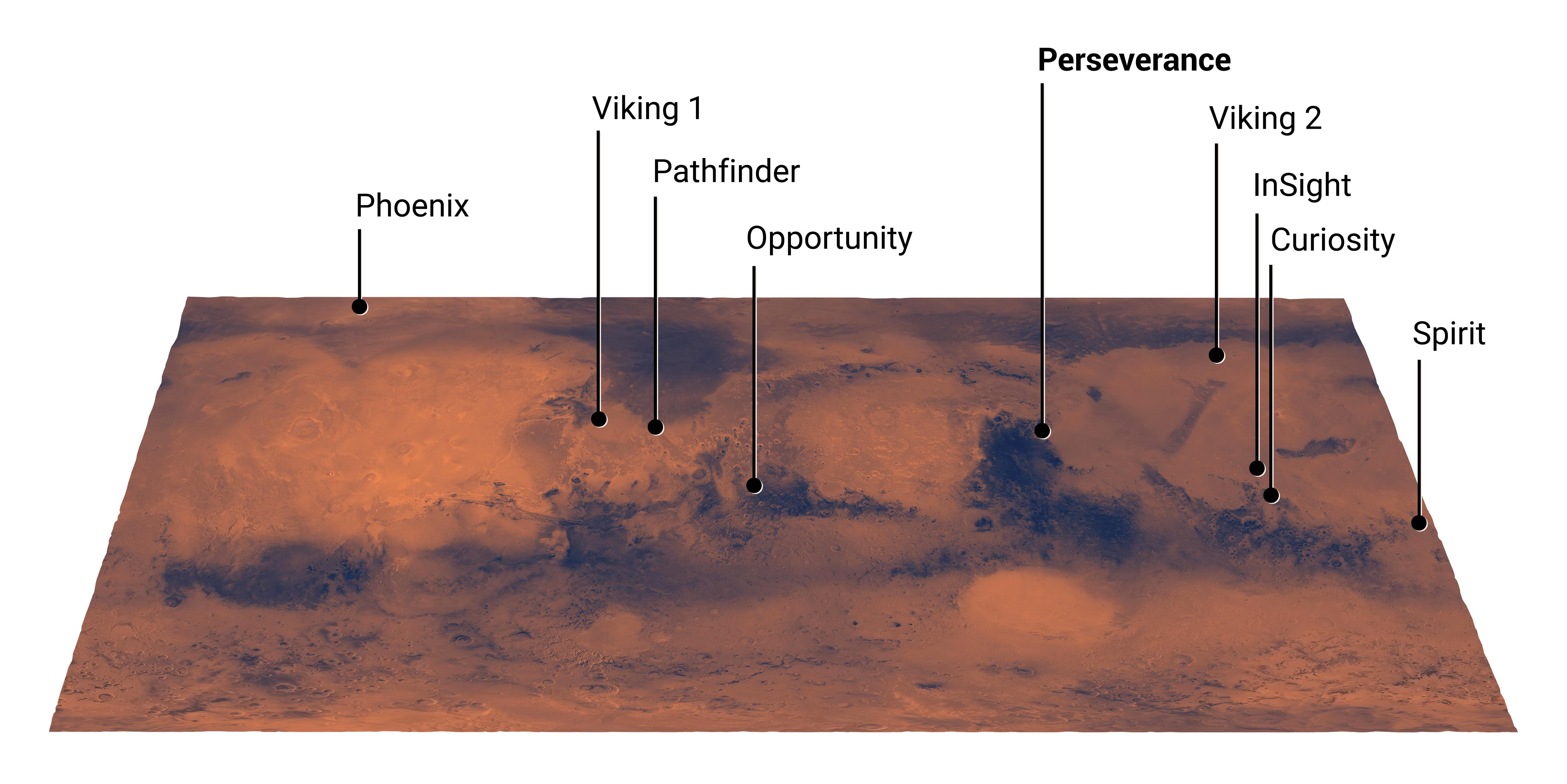
NASA's Mars landing sites (16 December 2020)

In 1999, Mars Climate Orbiter accidentally entered Mars's atmosphere and either burnt up or left Mars's orbit on an unknown trajectory.

There are a number of derelict spacecraft orbiting Mars whose location is not known precisely. There is a proposal to use the Optical Navigation Camera on the Mars Reconnaissance Orbiter to search for small moons, dust rings and old orbiters. As of 2016, there were believed to be eight derelict spacecraft in orbit around Mars (barring unforeseen event). The Viking 1 orbiter was not expected to decay until at least 2019. Mariner 9, which entered Mars orbit in 1971, was expected to remain in orbit until approximately 2022, when it was projected to enter the Martian atmosphere and either burn up, or crash into the planet's surface.

== Missions to the moons of Mars ==
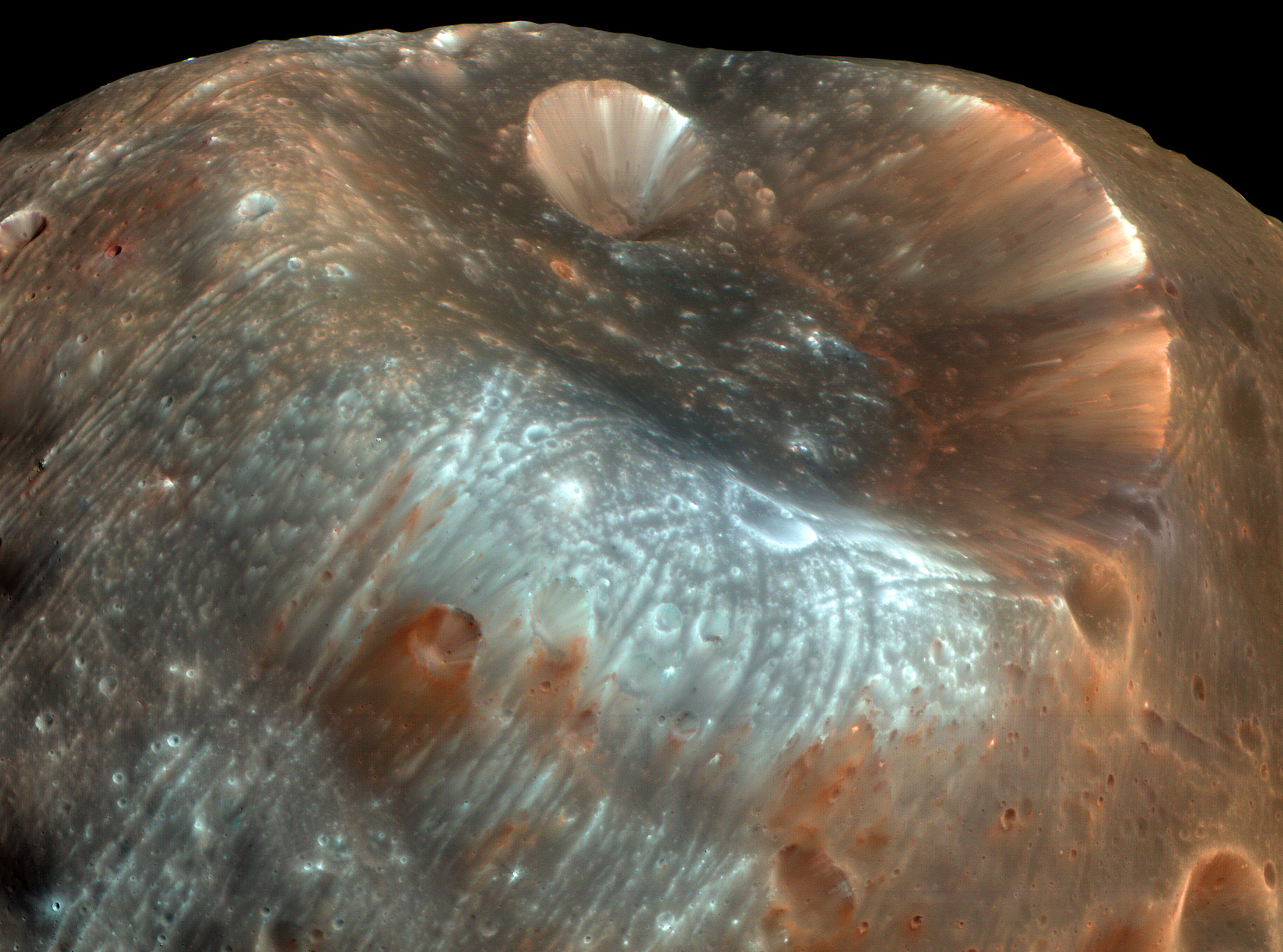
Phobos' Stickney Crater

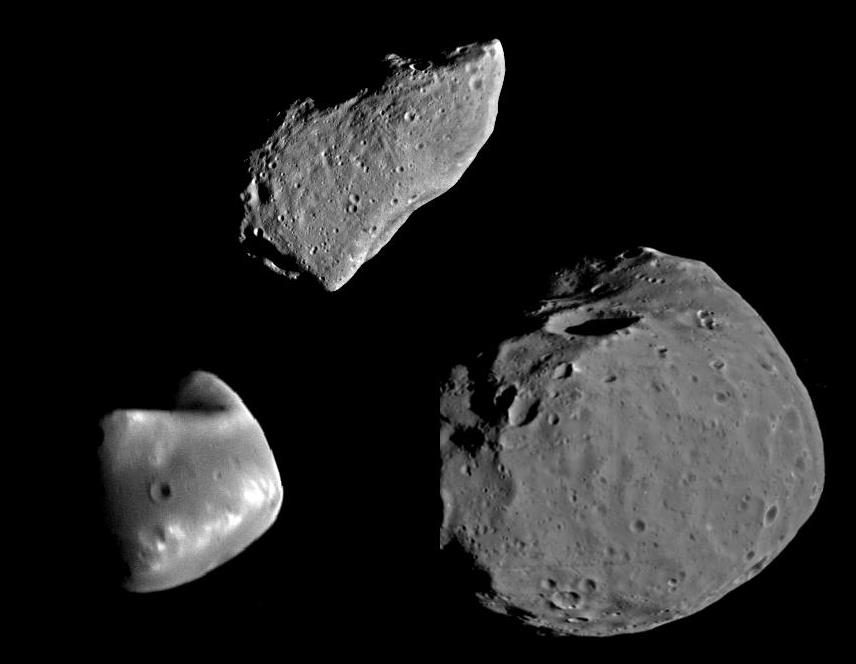
Deimos (lower left) and Phobos (lower right) compared with the asteroid 951 Gaspra

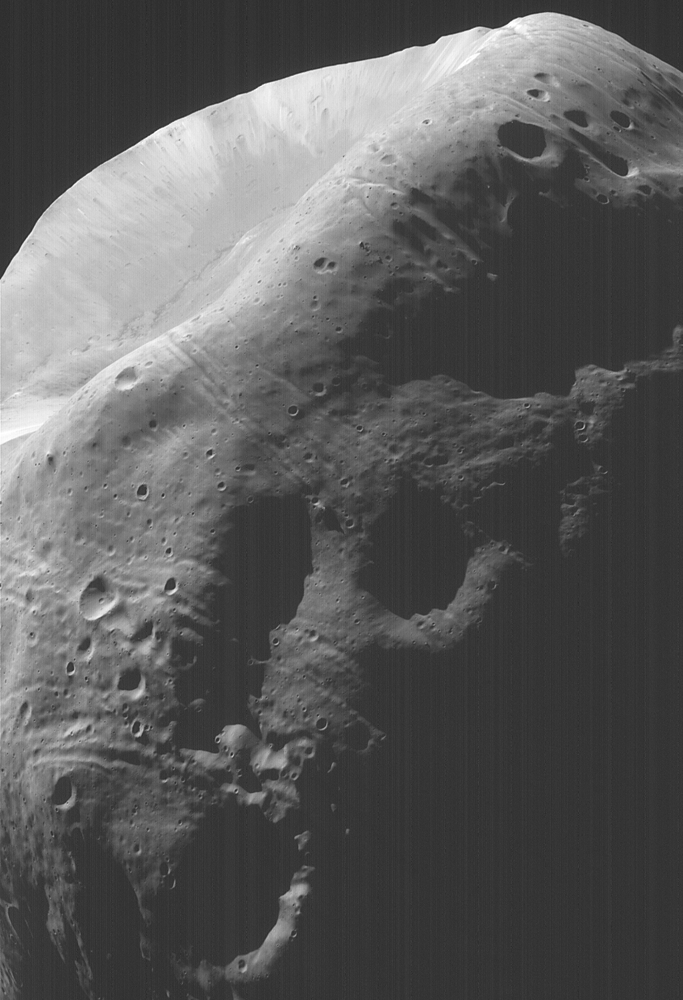
Phobos by Mars Global Surveyor in 1998

There were multiple missions proposed to explore the two moons of Mars, Phobos and Deimos.

Ongoing missions

Japanese mission Martian Moons eXploration (MMX), built on JAXA's expertise gained through the Hayabusa2 and SLIM missions, was launched on 19 October 2026. The mission includes a lander, a Phobos rover, Idefix, and a sample return.

Planned mission	Target	Reference
Martian Moons eXploration (MMX)	Phobos and Deimos	

Past missions

There have been three unsuccessful dedicated missions launched by the Soviet Union and Russia.

Mission	Target	Outcome	Reference
Phobos 1	Phobos	Spacecraft failure	
Phobos 2	Phobos	Spacecraft failure	
Fobos-Grunt	Phobos	Launch failure	

Past proposals

There have been at least three proposals in NASA's Discovery Program, including PADME, PANDORA, and MERLIN. The ESA has also considered a sample return mission, like Martian Moon Sample Return (MMSR).

Osiris-Rex 2 was a proposal to make OR a double mission, with the other one collecting samples from the two Mars moons. In 2012, it was considered the quickest and least expensive way to get samples from the moons.

The "Red Rocks Project", a part of Lockheed Martin's "Stepping Stones to Mars" program, proposed to explore Mars robotically from Deimos.

Proposal	Target	Reference
Aladdin	Phobos and Deimos	
DePhine	Phobos and Deimos	
DSR	Deimos	
Gulliver	Deimos	
Hall	Phobos and Deimos	
M-PADS	Phobos and Deimos	
Merlin	Phobos and Deimos	
MMSR	Phobos or Deimos	
OSIRIS-REx 2	Phobos or Deimos	
Pandora	Phobos and Deimos	
PCROSS	Phobos	
Phobos Surveyor	Phobos	
PRIME	Phobos	
Fobos-Grunt 2	Phobos	
Phootprint	Phobos	
PADME	Phobos and Deimos	

== Statistics ==
=== Summary ===
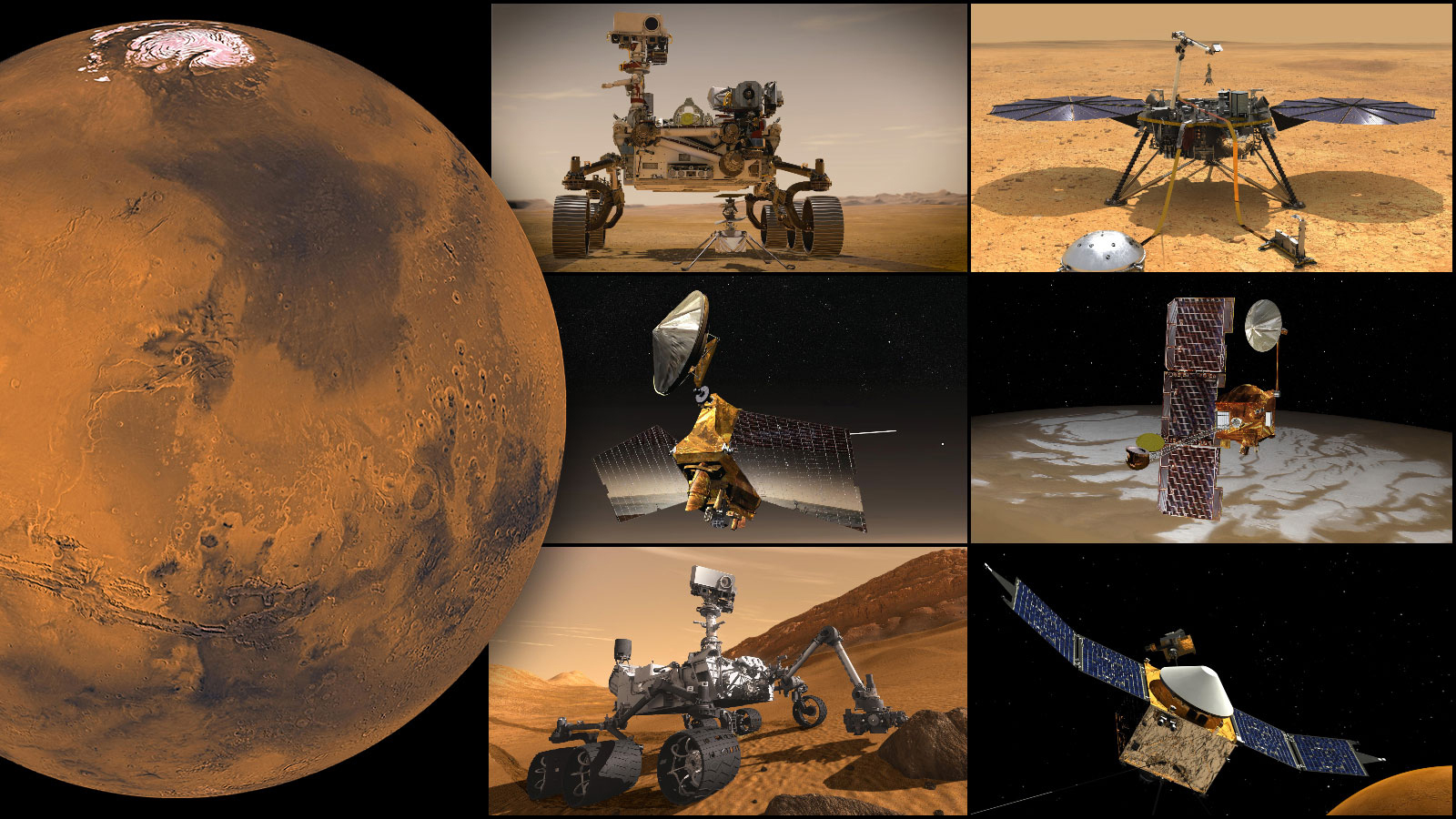
NASA missions to Mars (as of 2021): Perseverance rover/Ingenuity Mars Helicopter; InSight lander; Mars Reconnaissance Orbiter; Mars Odyssey orbiter; Curiosity rover; MAVEN orbiter

Launches to Mars
Decade
1960s	12
1970s	11
1980s	2
1990s	7
2000s	6
2010s	6
2020s	5

=== Mission milestone by country ===
Legend

Achieved
Failed attempt
† First to achieve

Mars missions
Country/Agency	Flyby	Orbit	Impact	Lander	Rover	Drone	Sample return	Crewed Landing
United States	Mariner 4, 1965 †	Mariner 9, 1971 †	Mars Polar Lander, 1999	Viking 1, 1976	Sojourner, 1997 †	Ingenuity, 2021 †	—	—
China	Tianwen-1, 2021	Tianwen-1, 2021	—	Tianwen-1, 2021	Zhurong, 2021	—	—	—
Soviet Union	Mars 2, 1971	Mars 2, 1971	Mars 2 Lander, 1971 †	Mars 3, 1971 †	PrOP-M, 1971	—	—	—
ESA	Mars Express, 2003	Mars Express, 2003	Schiaparelli EDM, 2016	Schiaparelli EDM, 2016	—	—	—	—
United Kingdom	Beagle 2, 2003	—	Beagle 2, 2003	Beagle 2, 2003 (Note: While Beagle 2 had landed intact, it failed to establish communication.)	—	—	—	—
India	MOM, 2014	MOM, 2014	—	—	—	—	—	—
Russia	TGO, 2016	TGO, 2016	Mars 96, 1996	Mars 96, 1996	—	—	—	—
(United Arab Emirates) UAE	Hope, 2021	Hope, 2021	—	—	—	—	—	—
Japan	Nozomi, 1998	Nozomi, 1998	—	—	—	—	—	—

Phobos missions
Country/Agency	Impact	Lander	Rover	Sample return
Soviet Union	Phobos 1, 1988	Phobos 1, 1988	Phobos 1, 1988	—
Russia	Fobos-Grunt, 2011	Fobos-Grunt, 2011	—	Fobos-Grunt, 2011
Japan	—	Martian Moons eXploration (MMX)	IDEFIX	Martian Moons eXploration (MMX)

=== Missions by organization/company ===
Country	Agency or company	Successful	Partial failure	Failure	Operational	Gravity assist	Total
United States	NASA	13	-	5	5	1	24
Soviet Union	Energia	1	6	10	-	-	17
Russia	Roscosmos	-	1	2	-	-	3
23 member states: Austria; Belgium; Czechia; Denmark; Estonia; Finland; France; Germany; Greece; Hungary; Ireland; Italy; Luxembourg; Netherlands; Norway; Poland; Portugal; Romania; Slovenia; Spain; Sweden; Switzerland; United Kingdom	ESA	-	2	-	-	1	3
China	CNSA	1	-	1	1	-	2
India	ISRO	1	-	-	-	-	1
United Arab Emirates	UAESA	1	-	-	1	-	1
Japan	JAXA	-	-	1	1	-	2
United Kingdom	NSC	-	-	1	-	-	1

== Future missions ==
=== Under development ===
Mission	Organisation	Proposed launch date	Type	Status
Rosalind Franklin	ESA (with NASA)	NET October 2028	Rover	under development
Tianwen-3	(China) CNSA	NET 2028	Mars sample return mission	under development
Relativity Space Mars science orbiter	(United States) Relativity Space / NASA	2028 (planned)	Orbiter carrying NASA's Aeolus atmospheric science instrument suite	under development
Mars Lander Mission	(India) ISRO	2031	Orbiter, lander, rover, aircraft	under development

=== Proposed missions ===
Mission	Organisation	Proposed launch	Type
Mars Telecommunications Network	(United States) NASA	TBA	Orbiter
Space Reactor‑1 Freedom	(United States) NASA	NET 2028	The "first nuclear powered interplanetary spacecraft" and several Ingenuity-class helicopters
SkyFall	(United States) NASA	NET 2028	Three helicopters, additional payload on SR-1 Freedom spacecraft.
TEREX	(Japan) NICT	Mid 2020s	Orbiter
Fobos-Grunt 2 and Mars-Grunt	(Russia) Roscosmos	2030s	Orbiter, lander, ascent vehicle, sample-return
M-MATISSE	ESA	2037	Two orbiters

== Unrealized missions ==
=== 1970s ===
- Mars 4NM and Mars 5NM – Projects intended by the Soviet Union for heavy Marsokhod (in 1973 according to initial plan of 1970) and Mars sample return (planned for 1975). The missions were to be launched on the failed N1 rocket.
- Mars 5M (Mars-79) – Double Soviet sample return mission planned to 1979 but cancelled due to complexity and technical problems
- Voyager-Mars – USA, 1970s – Two orbiters and two landers, launched by a single Saturn V rocket.

=== 1990s ===
- Vesta – A multi-purpose Soviet mission developed in cooperation with various European nations, set for 1991–1994 but canceled due to Soviet Union dissolution. The mission included a flyby of Mars, small landers or penetrator probes, delivery of the Mars Aerostat, and flybys of 1 Ceres or 4 Vesta and other asteroids.
- Mars Aerostat – Russian/French balloon for the cancelled Vesta mission and then for the failed Mars 96 mission, originally planned for the 1992 launch window, postponed to 1994 and then to 1996 before being ultimately cancelled.
- Mars Together – Combined U.S. and Russian mission study in the 1990s. To be launched by a Molniya with possible U.S. orbiter or lander.
- Mars Environmental Survey – A set of 16 landers planned for 1999–2009
- Mars-98 – Russian mission including an orbiter, lander, and rover, planned for 1998 launch opportunity as repeat of failed Mars 96 mission; cancelled due to lack of funding.

=== 2000s ===
- Mars Surveyor 2001 Lander – 2001 lander (refurbished, became Phoenix lander)
- Kitty Hawk – Mars aircraft micro-mission, proposed in 2003, the centennial of the Wright brothers' first flight. Its funding was eventually given to the 2003 Mars Network project.
- NetLander – 2007 Mars landers
- Beagle 3 – 2009 British lander mission meant to search for life, past or present
- Mars Telecommunications Orbiter – 2009 orbiter concept for telecommunications

=== 2010s–2020s ===
- Mars One – Crewed Mars Mission concept originally announced in 2012 which would have intended to permanently leave a , planning to land a demo lander on Mars by 2016, with a crewed landing to follow by 2023. These dates were delayed multiple times, and the project was eventually cancelled, with the company going bankrupt in 2019
- Sky-Sailor – Swiss aircraft to take detailed pictures of Mars' surface.
- Mars Astrobiology Explorer-Cacher – Early concept for Mars Sample Return, originally intended as part of the 2018 rover concept, cancelled due to budget cuts in 2011. Sample cache goal later moved to Mars 2020 rover.
- Red Dragon – A SpaceX proposal featuring a derivative of the Dragon 2 capsule, designed to land with the use of aerobraking and retro-propulsion.First planned for 2018, then for 2020. Later canceled in favor of the Starship system.
- Tumbleweed rover, wind-propelled sphere
- MELOS – Japanese rover and aircraft concept
- Icebreaker Life – Astrobiology lander concept
- Next Mars Orbiter – Orbiter, communication satellite
- Mars MetNet – Atmospheric probes concept
- Mars Geyser Hopper – Lander mission, mission to Mars geysers
- Mars Micro Orbiter – Small satellites as part of SIMPLEx program
- Biological Oxidant and Life Detection – Impactor
- SatRevolution – Nano-satellite mission.
- NASA-ESA Mars Sample Return
- Commercial Mission to Mars by Relativity Space and Impulse Space in 2026
- International Mars Ice Mapper Mission by NASA Canadian Space Agency, Italian Space Agency and JAXA, proposed for 2030s NASA later withdrew from the project which led to program cancellation.
- Mars Life Explorer by NASA, originally set to occur in the 2030s – Not selected .
- MAGGIE Unmanned aircraft design for Mars – Not selected.

== See also ==
- Exploration of Mars
  - Mars flyby
  - List of Mars orbiters
  - Mars landing
  - Mars rover
  - List of artificial objects on Mars
  - Comparison of embedded computer systems on board the Mars rovers
  - Human mission to Mars
- Timeline of Solar System exploration
  - List of artificial objects on extraterrestrial surfaces
  - List of missions to Venus
  - List of missions to the Moon
  - List of missions to minor planets
  - List of missions to the outer planets
  - List of missions to comets
