= Idefix (rover) =

Martian moons lander

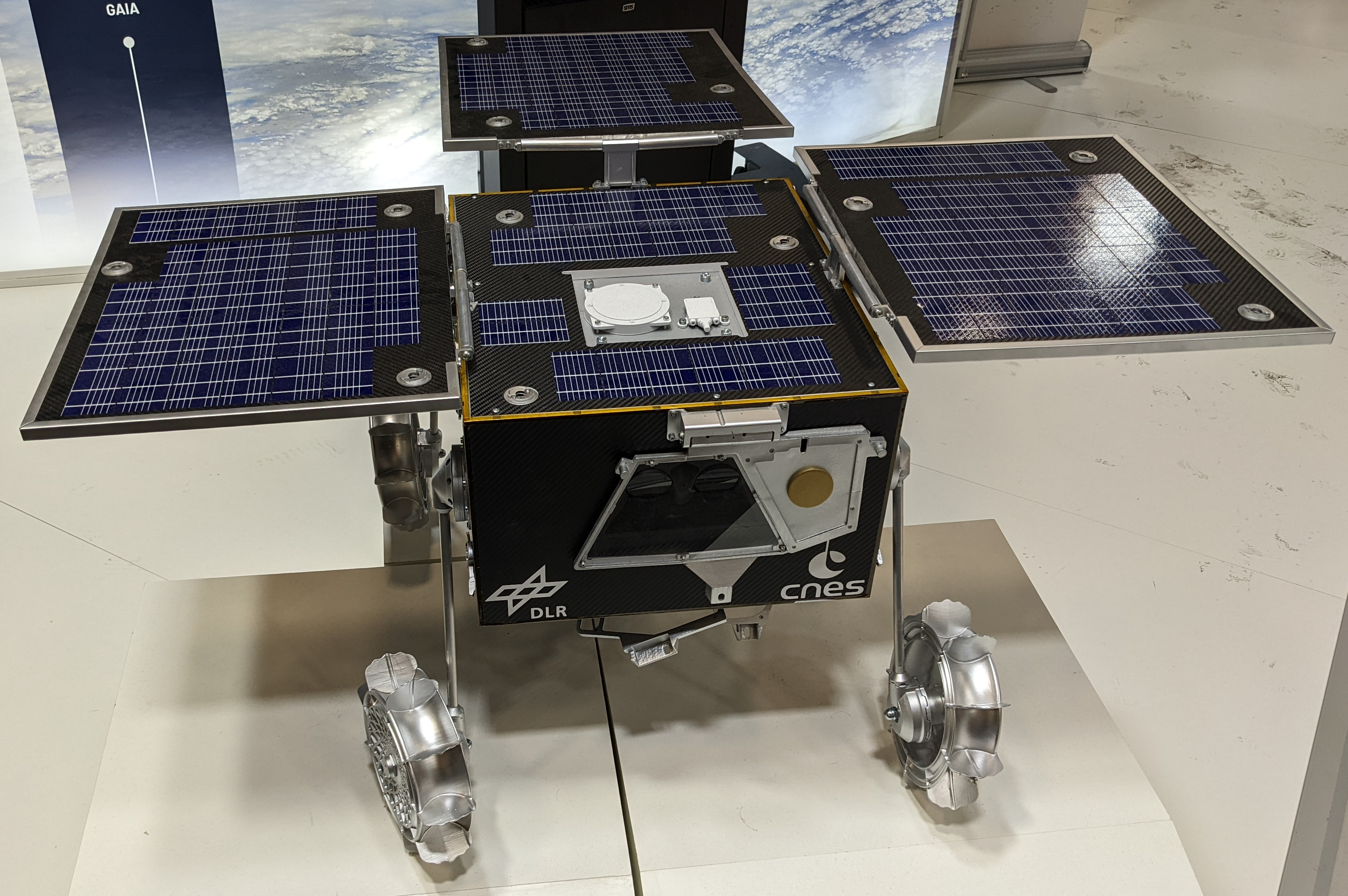
- Mission type: Phobos rover
- Operator: CNES/DLR/JAXA
- Mission duration: Planned: 100 days

Spacecraft properties
- Dry mass: 23.47 kilograms (51.7 lb)

Idefix is a rover developed by the French space agency CNES and the German Aerospace Centre (DLR) in cooperation with the Japanese space agency JAXA for the planned Martian Moons eXploration (MMX) mission to Phobos, a moon of Mars. The rover is designed to land on Phobos and explore its surface before the MMX spacecraft lands on the moon and collects samples for return to Earth. Idefix was launched with the MMX spacecraft on 19 October 2026.

Idefix is a ~23 kg, solar-powered rover carrying a suite of instruments for surface and regolith investigations: the RAman spectrometer for MMX (RAX), a miniaturized infrared radiometer (miniRAD), and imaging systems that include a pair of navigation cameras and two downward-facing WheelCams to observe wheel-soil interactions. The rover is a Franco-German development in cooperation with JAXA. DLR developed the structure, locomotion and thermal instruments, and CNES developed cameras, avionics, power, and communications. The rover is designed for at least 100 days of operations on the surface of Phobos.

Deployment is planned after roughly 18 months of Phobos observations by the MMX spacecraft. The orbiter will release Idefix from about 40–100 m altitude into a chosen ~100m in diameter landing area; after autonomous uprighting and solar-array deployment, the rover will traverse at a speed of around 1mm per second and its observations will serve to characterize local terrain, support landing-site assessment, and inform MMX sampling activities. Operations will be shared between control centres in Toulouse and Cologne, with all commands and telemetry relayed via the MMX spacecraft. The name Idefix, honouring the dog from the Asterix comics, was announced at the 2023 Paris Air Show.

== Naming ==
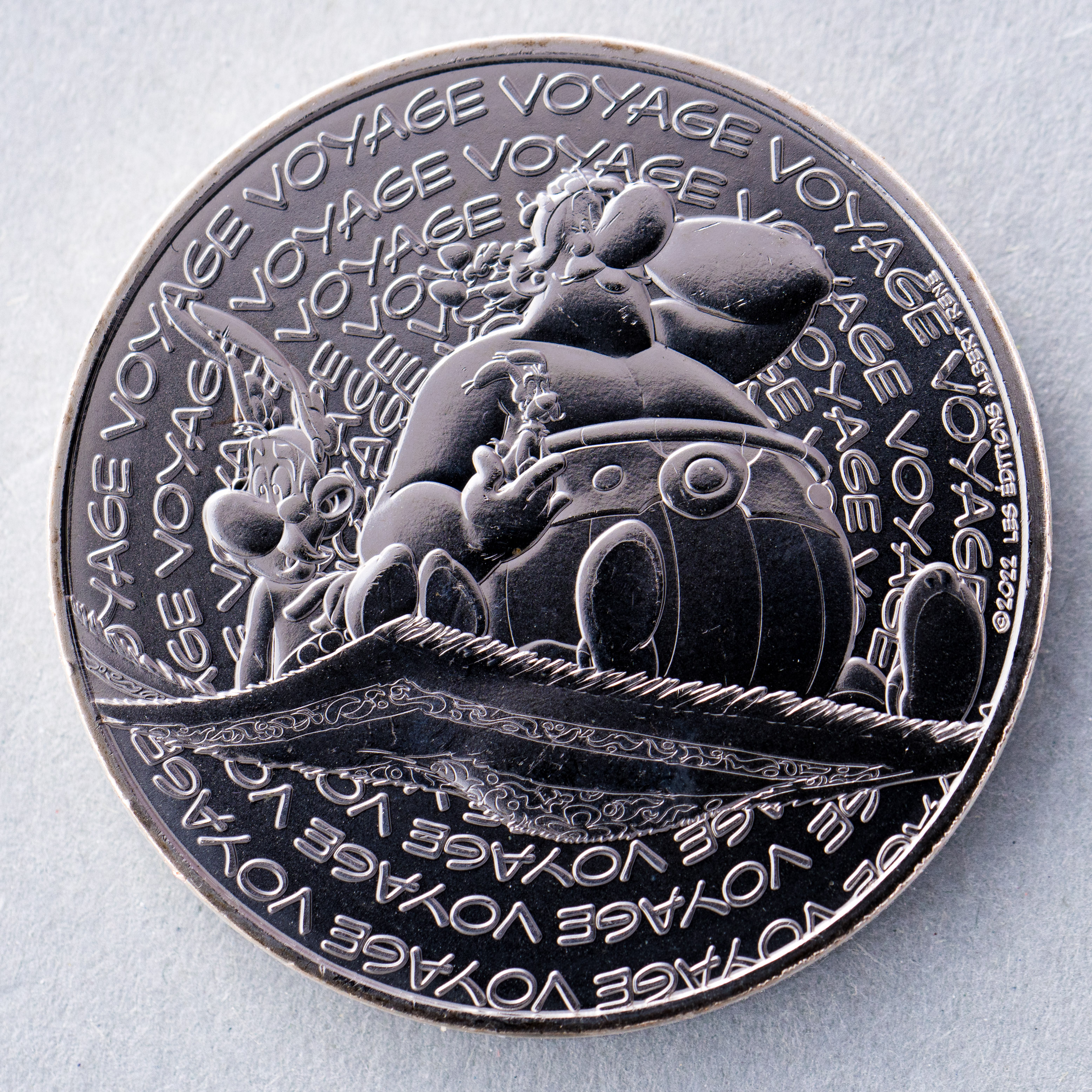
French Euro coin with Asterix, Obelix, and Idefix

The rover is named after Idéfix, the French name for Dogmatix, Obelix's dog in the French comic Asterix. The name Idefix is also used for the character in the German translation. Asterix is a popular comic in both France and Germany.

The name was chosen at 2023 Paris Air Show to connect it with the first French satellite, Asterix.

== Operations ==
Idefix is a joint Franco-German project between the German Aerospace Centre (DLR), and France's National Centre for Space Studies (CNES). DLR developed the rover structure, locomotion system, connectors to the MMX spacecraft, and both spectrometer and radiometer. CNES developed the cameras, computer, power and communication systems. The rover will be operated from two centres in Toulouse, France, and in Cologne, Germany. Two control centres will alternate the rover operations: during the cruise phase, centres will alternate execution of flight events, whereas during surface operations on Phobos, centres will function in parallel with weekly role exchanges, one serving as prime centre executing current operations while the other functions as secondary centre planning subsequent seven-day activity sequences. Communication architecture routes all rover commands and telemetry through the MMX spacecraft and JAXA's Sagamihara ground segment; direct Earth-rover transmission is impossible. Spacecraft-rover contact will occur twice per Earth day.

The rover was assembled and tested in Toulouse, France. In 2024, the rover was sent from Europe to Japan for integration with the MMX spacecraft.

Because of Phobos's low gravity, which is almost two thousand times lower than Earth's, it is impossible to test the rover properly with a flight spare, as was done with NASA's Mars rovers: "a rover two thousand times lighter than the MMX rover would have to be used for a representative test". A simulation model was created to address this issue, which allows researchers to study the rover's behaviour.

The rover weighs 23.47 kg, of which scientific instruments – cameras, a radiometer, and a Raman spectrometer – weigh 2.44 kg. The rover's body is a rectangle of 231 by 376 by 415 millimetres, with 4 solar panels of 415 by 363 millimetres (total area 0.36 square meters) which should produce "at least 60 watt-hours per Phobos day (7h)". The rover is expected to operate for 100 days. Its expected speed is 1 mm per second.

The rover deployment from the main spacecraft will occur only after 18 months of Phobos observations: the moon is poorly studied, and the landing site will be selected during the mission; landing is expected in 2029. Both Idefix and MMX will land in one area of about 300 × 300 m. Idefix will land first, and will assist the MMX team scouting the area. The landing zone of the rover is about 100 m in diameter, while MMX has smaller landing zone of about 20 x 20 m. The rover will be deployed to the surface of Phobos from the main spacecraft from an altitude of 40 to 100 metres, similar to the MASCOT deployment from Hayabusa2 to an asteroid. Idefix can experience a "bouncing phase" during landing. The landing zones of the two spacecraft must be separated, so that the MMX landing won't interfere with the rover and won't damage its solar panels.

After landing, the rover will execute the program to reorient itself using its wheels, and deploy its solar panels. Failure to do so will be a failure of the mission, as rover must generate enough power to warm its computer and instruments.

Phobos's regolith and surface are poorly understood due to a lack of dedicated spacecraft mission, most observations of the moon were done by various Mars orbiters.

The rover's objectives are to touch the surface of Phobos, to check the behaviour of the surface under mechanical actions and to relay this information to Earth. It must also demonstrate that it is possible to use wheeled locomotion on a body with such low gravity.

Main rover tasks:

- Close-up and high-resolution imaging of the surface terrain.
- Regolith science (e.g., geometrical properties like grain size and shape distributions; mechanical properties like surface strength; dynamical properties linked to how the regolith flows).
- Measurements of the mineralogical composition of the surface material (by Raman spectroscopy).
- Determination of the thermal properties of the surface material (surface temperature, emissivity, thermal conductivity, layering).
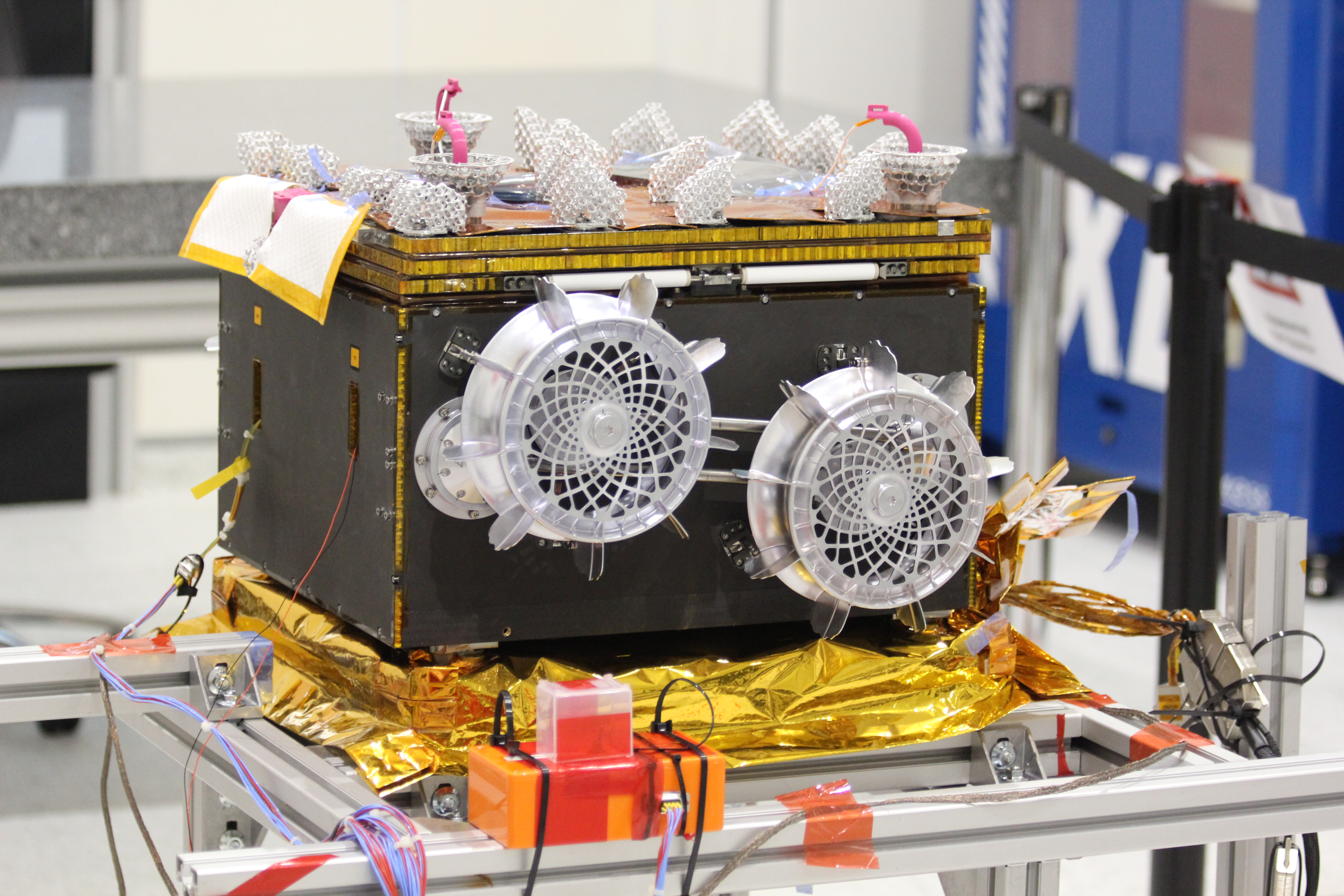
Folded rover in a cruise state

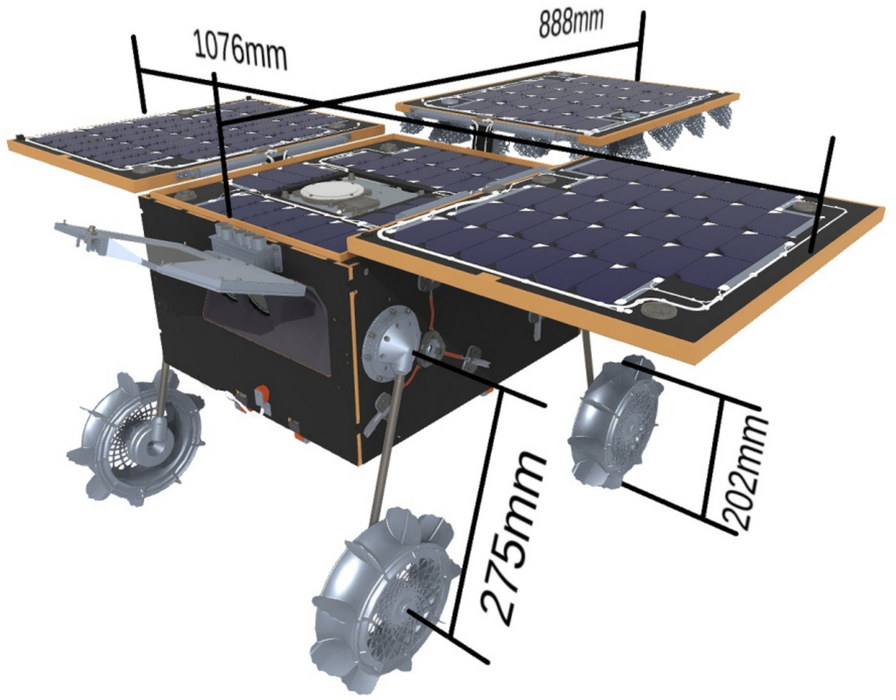
Idefix in on-Phobos configuration with dimensions

Simulation of landing and rover deployment

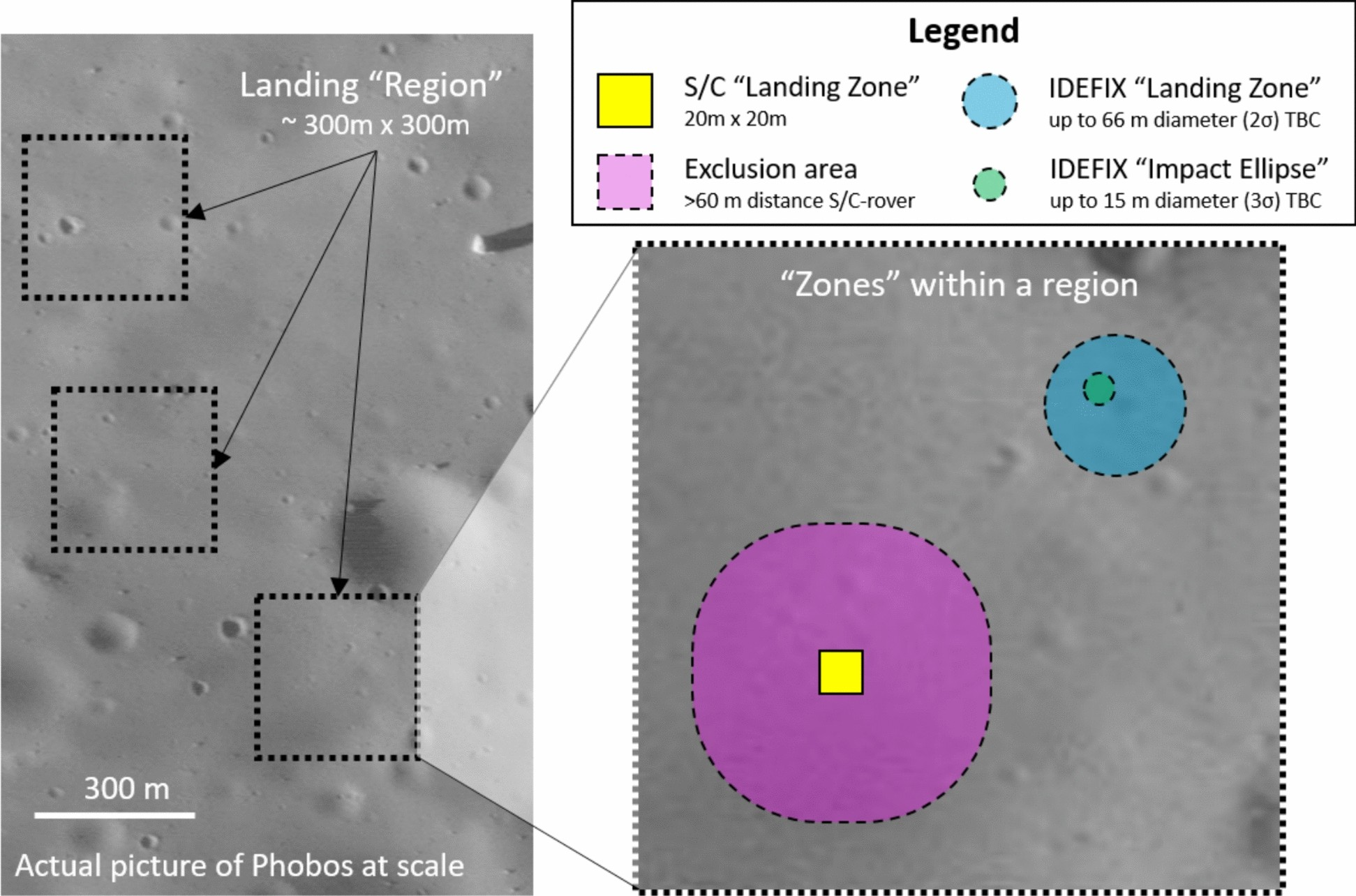
Landing regions and zones on Phobos, at scale

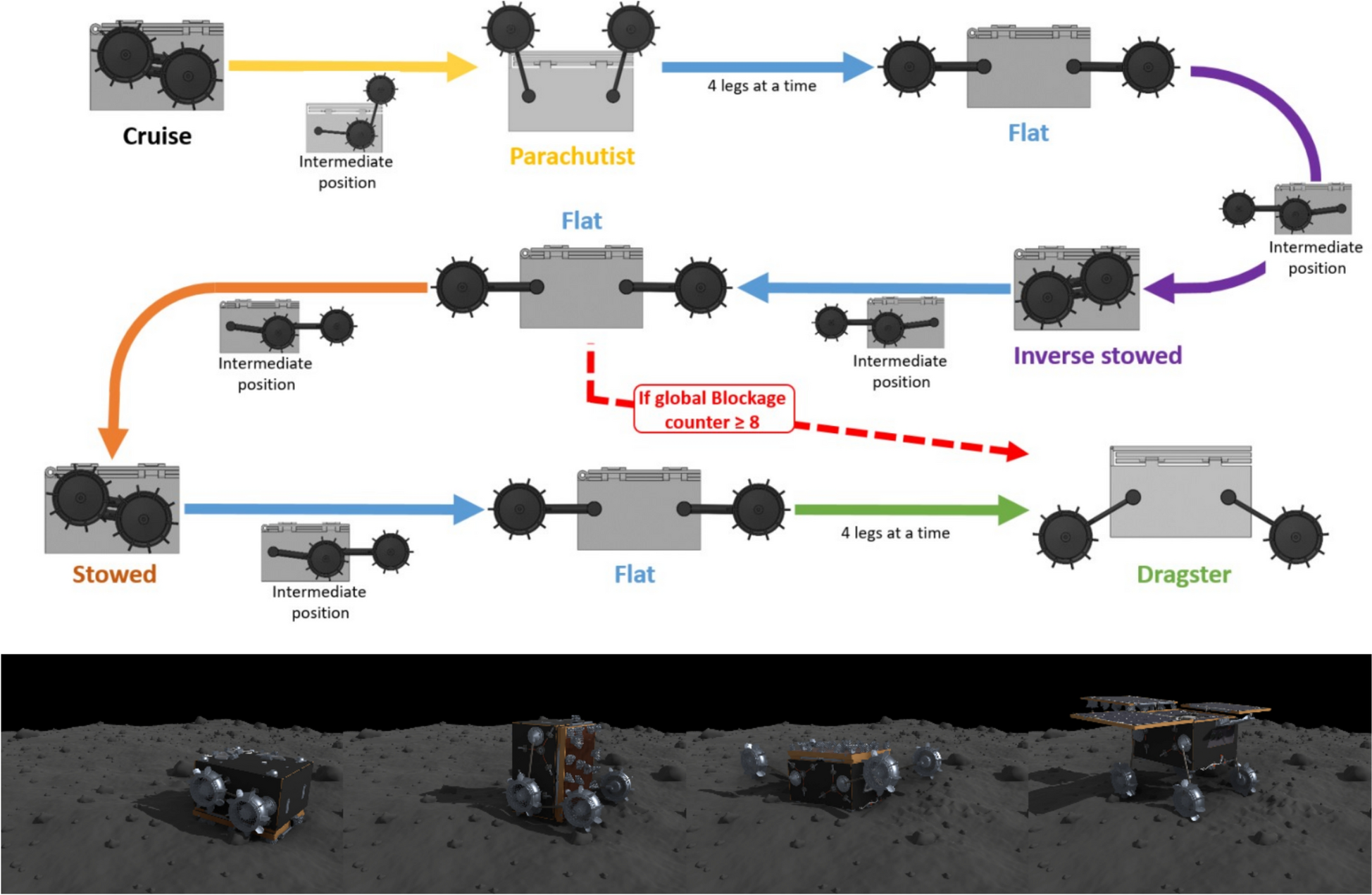
Sequence of autonomous uprighting. (top) schematic of and (bottom) impression of rover in simulated environment

== Locomotion system ==
Idefix's locomotion system (LOCO) was designed for the extremely low Phobos gravity, 0.0030 to 0.0068 m/s2. LOCO will upright the rover immediately after landing, regardless of its orientation. The rover has four individually actuated wheels. LOCO has four modes of operation: driving, alignment, uprighting, and passthrough. Both DLR and CNES developed autonomous navigation software, but initially the rover will move after receiving driving plans from Earth.

Each wheel has 9 blades, or "grousers", which can be used on both hard surface and on sandy terrain. Wheel weighs only 190 grams, its "mesh-like structure" was designed using topology optimisation

== Instruments ==
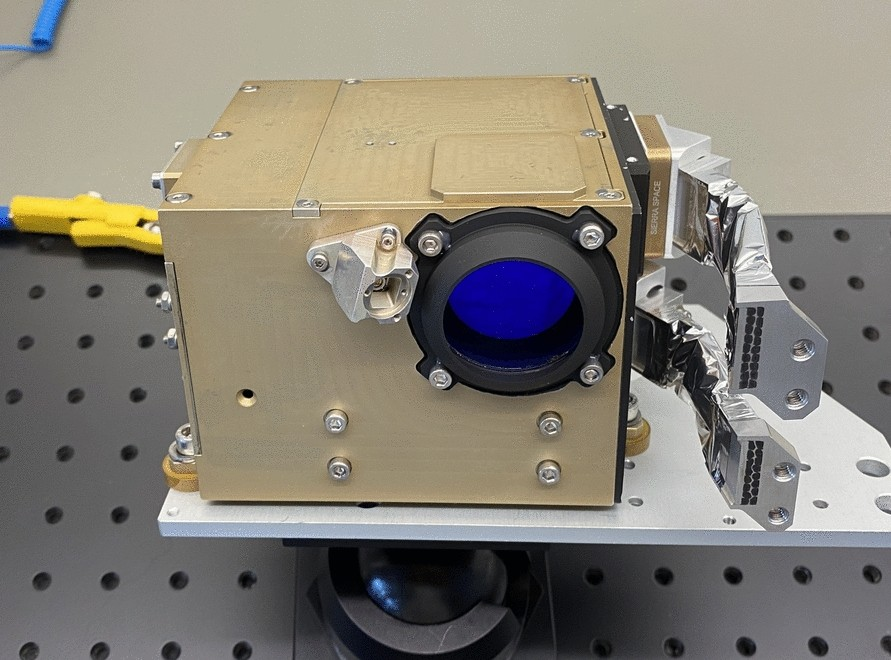
RAX

RAman Spectrometer for MMX (RAX)

The Raman spectrometer was developed by DLR, INTA/UVA and JAXA/UTOPS/Rikkyo. The instrument is compact (81x98x125 mm) and weighs less than 1.4 kg. RAX has an opto-mechanical autofocus that uses a green Nd:YAG laser for excitation of the sample. RAX can analyze an area of 50 μm, collecting backscattered light, filtering out Rayleigh light, and guiding remaining photons through the spectrometer module into a CMOS detector. RAX also has a "so-called Verification Target", a "deuteriated polyethylene terephthalate (PET) pellet". RAX can work in a spectral range of 535 to 680 nm, which allows it to detect "a wide variety of minerals, capturing vibrational features ranging from low-frequency lattice modes to high-energy bond stretches involving hydrogen atoms" and identify both "primary and altered mineral phases".

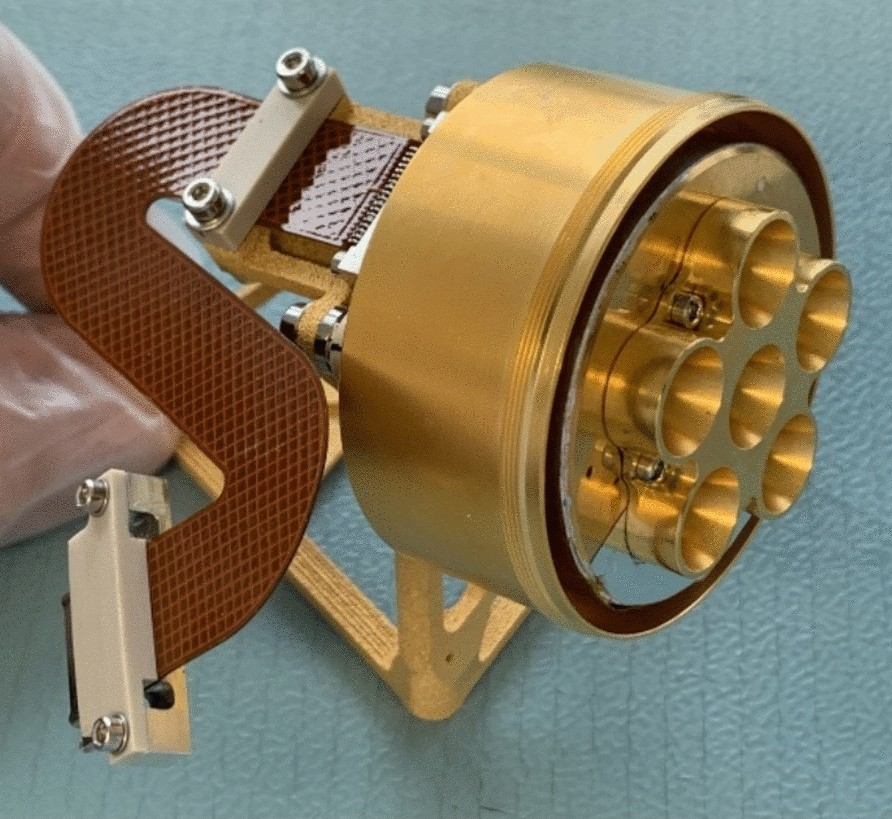
miniRAD

Miniaturized radiometer (miniRAD)

miniRAD is a radiometer that will measure radiative flux emitted in infrared to measure the surface temperature. The instrument will use thermophile sensors and is mounted in the front of the rover. Its design has a "strong heritage" from Rosetta MUPUS thermal mapper, the MASCOT radiometer, and the InSight radiometer. miniRAD has six sensors with a field of view of 45 degrees, and will observe objects located at 25 to 150 cm from it.

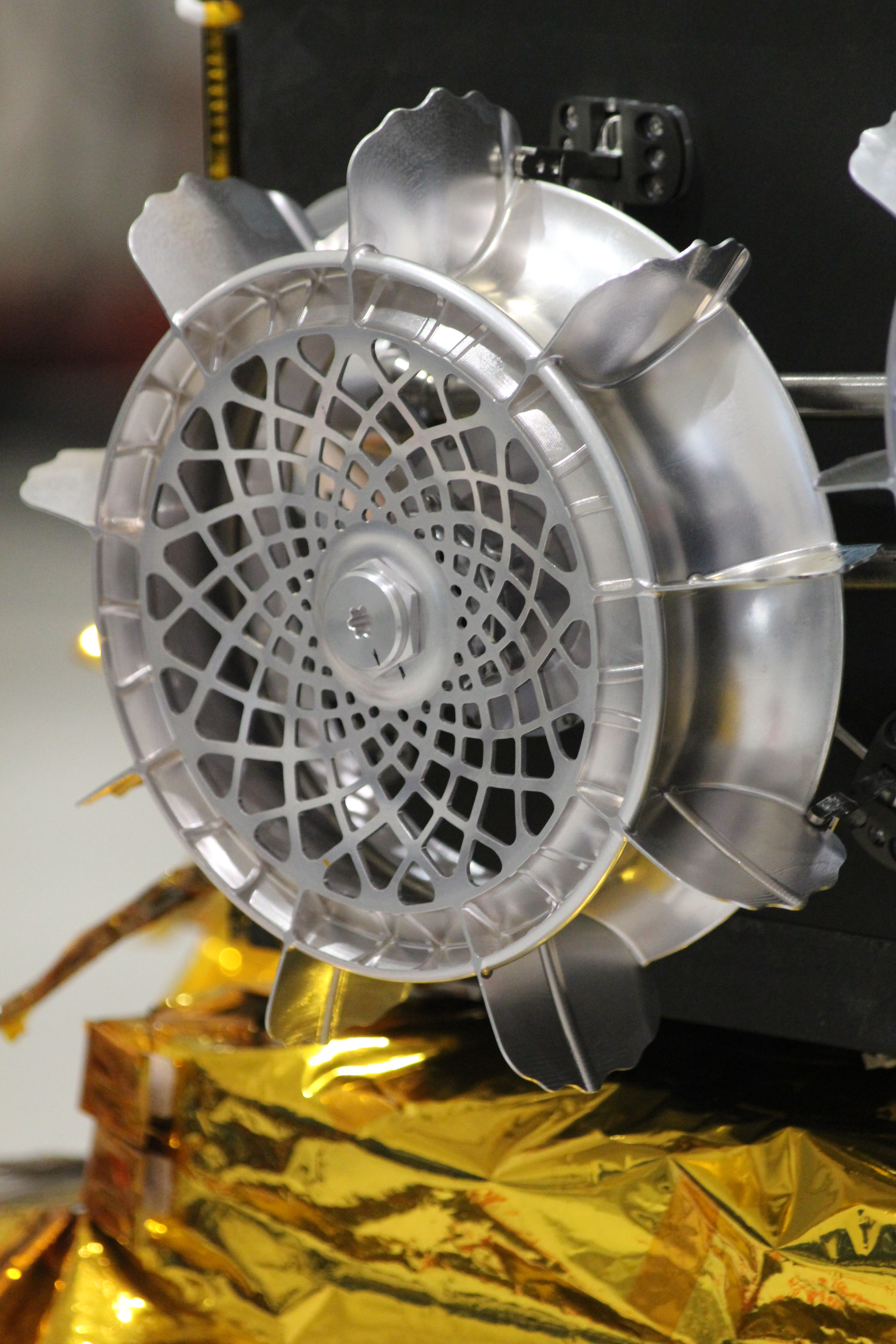
Rover's wheel

WheelCams

The WheelCams are a pair of downward-facing, panchromatic microcameras on the underside of the rover, designed to observe the front wheels and, behind it, the trench cut by that wheel as the rover drives across Phobos. Built around 2048×2048 CASPEX (CMV4000) sensors with optics tilted by ~3° to place the focal plane near the ground, they achieve ~100 μm/pixel at ~30 cm standoff and retain sharp focus from roughly 20–50 cm. To compensate for permanent shadowing under the rover deck, each camera carries co-located LEDs: four white sources for general imaging and three narrow-band emitters at 590, 720, and 880 nm for multispectral snapshots. Operations include stills and "movie" modes matched to the rover's slow traverse of 1mm a second, with adaptive on-sensor binning (e.g., 2×2) to throttle data volume; transparent shutters protect the optics until the vehicle completes its autonomous separation-landing-uprighting-deployment sequence.

WheelCam imagery will be used to extract regolith particle size and shape down to ~200 μm, detect cohesive/adhesive clumping, and infer bulk mechanical properties—friction angle, cohesion, shear strength, density, and bearing capacity—from wheel sinkage, slip, talus geometry, and trench wall stability. Additional goals include detecting shallow subsurface layering, assessing space weathering and mineralogical variations via LED reflectance contrasts inside versus outside tracks, mapping regolith into geological classes along the traverse, and even constraining the local gravitational acceleration by tracking ballistic grains lofted during motion. A dedicated single-wheel testbed (ISAE-SUPAERO) and soft-sphere discrete-element simulations support algorithm development and low-g terramechanics scaling (via rotational Froude number). A Structure-from-Motion workflow on consecutive WheelCam frames reconstructs 3D trench topography and camera trajectory, enabling estimates of rover linear speed, slip ratio, sinkage, and angle of repose; these in-situ measurements complement orbiter instruments and de-risk MMX sampling operations on Phobos.

The specific WheelCam science objectives are (i) Determine the physical properties of the regolith particles, (ii) Determine the bulk mechanical properties of the regolith, (iii) Determine the dynamical behavior of the regolith, (iv) Observe layering in the shallow sub-surface, (v) Constrain on the mineralogical composition of the surface material, (vi) Assess space weathering, (vii) Determine regolith geological classes and (viii) Constrain the absolute local gravitational acceleration.

NavCams

Two navigation cameras are on the top of the front panel of the rover. Mass of both cameras is just 526 grams. Its design and characteristics are the same as on the Rashid 1 lunar rover. Cameras are equipped with white LEDs which will allow observations at night. The cameras were developed by 3DPLUS and CNES (CMOS detector) and Lambda-X (wide-angle optical lens). The detector is a CASPEX detector of 2048 x 2048 pixels with RGGB Bayer filters; pixel size is 5.5 μm.

== Comparable mini-rovers ==
Idefix is not the first mini-rover: French-German MASCOT flew on the Hayabusa2 spacecraft, and ESA/DLR Philae lander flew on Rosetta. Several rovers were proposed but not selected; two are proposed for the ESA Ramses mission to an asteroid.

Small-body landers comparison
Mission	Lander	Launch	Type of I/F-System	System mass (dry) [kg]	Structural mass, Lander [kg]	Structural mass, I/F-system [kg]	1. EF (system) [Hz]
Rosetta	Philae	2004	Body-mounted	97.6	16.70	8.70	91.6
Mars Premier	NetLander SurfM	(2009)	Body-mounted	69.0	9.67	9.0	182.0
Hayabusa2	MASCOT	2014	Ded. I/F-system	11.0	0.81	0.70	125.0
AIM	MASCOT2	(2020)	Ded. I/F-system	14.6	2.17	0.71	127.0
OKEANOS	Jupiter Trojan asteroid lander	(2024)	Body-mounted	85.3	6.40	—	89.9
MMX	Idefix	2026	Ded. I/F-system	23.1	2.96	1.19	122.0
Ramses	MASCOT3	(2028)	Ded. I/F-system	18.5	Comparable to MASCOT2		
Ramses	APOSSUM	(2028)	Ded. I/F-system	84.5	6.90	5.10	116.0

- Launch dates in parentheses indicate an "initially planned launch date", i.e. either not launched or not confirmed.
