= Mars Aerostat =

French Mars balloon mission

Mars Aerostat was a French Mars balloon mission to explore the martian surface over a planned 10 day mission. Initially intended to be France's contribution to Mars 94, the Aerostat was to be built by the French CNES as their contribution to the program lead by the Soviet Union. After delays the Aerostat was later reassigned to the Mars 96 due to the collapse of the Soviet Union. The Aerostat was to be composed of three primary components, a large cylindrical balloon, a payload gondola, and a guide rope attached in that order from top to bottom. The Aerostat was intended to operational in the martian northern hemisphere, specifically Acidalia Planitia, Arcadia Planitia, and Utopia Planitia. The flight plan was to have the Aerostat travel at max 4 kilometers in altitude during the martian day and rest roughly 70 meters in altitude during the martian night on its guide rope. During its mission lifetime the Aerostat was expected to be carried by the martian winds northeast between 1000 kilometers to 2000 kilometers. Due to the Aerostat being a balloon which floats over the martian surface and neither orbit far above the surface nor be confined to the surface like a lander, the scientific goals of the Aerostat reflected this fact. The Aerostat's major scientific objectives pertained to high resolution imaging of the surface, measuring changes in local magnetic fields, infrared and gamma spectroscopy of the surface, and subsurface radar sounding. The project was ultimately canceled in 1995 due to a combination of engineering, political, and operational challenges. Mars 96, the mission the Aerostat was intended to be a part of, launched without the Aerostat which ultimately failed at leaving Earth orbit.

== Experiments ==
=== PRISM ===
The Permafrost Radar Investigation of the Subsurface of Mars (PRISM) was the ground penetrating radar instrument with the intended goal of to see up to 3 kilometers into the Martian subsurface. The primary goal of the experiment was to get a greater understanding of martian geology and the martian subsurface more broadly, this would be achieved through coating the guide rope in titanium which allowed the guide rope to act as an antenna for radar sounding. PRISM was intended to operate at night when the guide rope would drag against the ground.

=== AREIS ===
Areis was intended to be the gamma ray spectrometer for the Mars Aerostat. It would be mounted inside one of the guide rope segments and its primary scientific objective was to study the surface composition. Unlike PRISM which was intended to operate during the martian night, AREIS was intended to operate during the Martian day (sol) while the Aerostat was floating above the martian surface.

=== BALTE ===
Balte was intended to be a camera that sees in visible light designed to take high resolution photos of Mars and send them back to earth. It would have been mounted to the gondola pointing downwards at the surface along its voyage with a resolution of up to 15 centimeters.

=== ALPHA ===
Alpha was intended to be an Infrared Spectrometer that would study the geology of the martian surface through studying its composition.

=== Meteorological package ===
The meteorologic package was intended to be a general meteorological experiment suit with pressure, temperature, humidity, and wind speed measuring instruments to document the varying meteorological conditions of the martian atmosphere over the 2000 km the Aerostat would travel.

=== Magnetometer ===
The magnetometer of the Aerostat was intended to find local distortions in the local magnetic fields.

=== Laser altimeter ===
The altimeter of the Aerostat was intended to measure the changing aerosol densities in various altitudes and locations in the martian atmosphere.

== Design ==
=== Balloon ===
The Physical balloon was described as "sausage shaped' with a length of 42 meters, a with of over 13 meters, and a thickness of just 6 microns, the entire balloon would have had 5500 cubic meters of volume when inflated weighing between 19 and 24.5 kilograms.

=== Payload ===
The payload of the balloon would be attached to the balloon, suspended 25 meters under neath and is referred to as the gondola. The gondola was to weigh 15 kilos and would have a total volume of 90 cubic decimeters and was intended to house many of the experiments of the mission.

=== Guide rope ===
The tether guide rope also referred to as "the snake" was to be a flexible tether suspended from a 50-meter elastic tether attached to the bottom of the gondola, the snake itself was to be about 10 meters long with a diameter ranging from 5 centimeters and 6 centimeters. The "snake" was to be coated in Titanium for the PRISM experiment as it would house both the PRISM and AREIS experiments.

== Mission profile ==
=== Day night flight plan ===
During the day the Aerostat was intended to operate at altitudes of up to 4000 meters during the day and at night the change in temperature would result in the Aerostat lowering in altitude to 70 meters above the surface, allowing the guide rope to drag against the surface of the planet.

=== Communications ===
The Aerostat would not be able to directly communicate with Earth by itself, instead a Russian built orbiter as another part of the Mars 94 [reassigned to Mars 96 later] mission was to be used to communicate with the Mars Aerostat and Earth allowing for the findings of the Aerostat to be transmitted back to Earth.

== See also ==
- Mars 96
- Interkosmos
