= Mars Micro Orbiter =

Spacecraft mission concept

Mars Micro Orbiter (MMO) is a spacecraft mission concept that would place a small and inexpensive satellite in orbit around the planet Mars to study some aspects of the Mars atmosphere in visible and infrared wavelengths.

The orbiter study will undergo a preliminary design review in March 2018, potentially launching as a secondary payload on another mission in 2020.

== Overview ==
In April 2015, NASA's Small Innovative Missions for Planetary Exploration (SIMPLEx) program requested proposals for interplanetary CubeSat investigations, and received 22 submissions. The MMO was not selected for launch, but in 2017 it was awarded grants for further technology development.

In 2015, the concept considered a 6U CubeSat with potential to also serve as an orbital communication relay for Mars surface-based missions, and by 2017 it had evolved to a 12U CubeSat; that is about 16 kg, and measuring 20×20×30 cm. The orbiter study will undergo a preliminary design review in March 2018, potentially launching as a secondary payload on another mission in 2020.

The Principal Investigator is Michael Malin, from Malin Space Science Systems.

== Objectives ==
The MMO would study the Mars atmosphere in visible and infrared wavelengths from Mars orbit. The science measurements include:

- atmospheric thermal structure, dust and condensate clouds, and seasonal and perennial polar cap behavior.
- characterize the dynamics and energy budget of the current Mars atmosphere.
- support present and future Mars missions.
- help characterize present-day habitability.
- potential to provide orbital communication relay for Mars surface-based missions.

== See also ==
Atmospheric orbiters at Mars

- ExoMars Trace Gas Orbiter
- Mars Orbiter Mission
- MAVEN orbiter
