= Martian Moons eXploration =

Japanese sample-return mission to Phobos

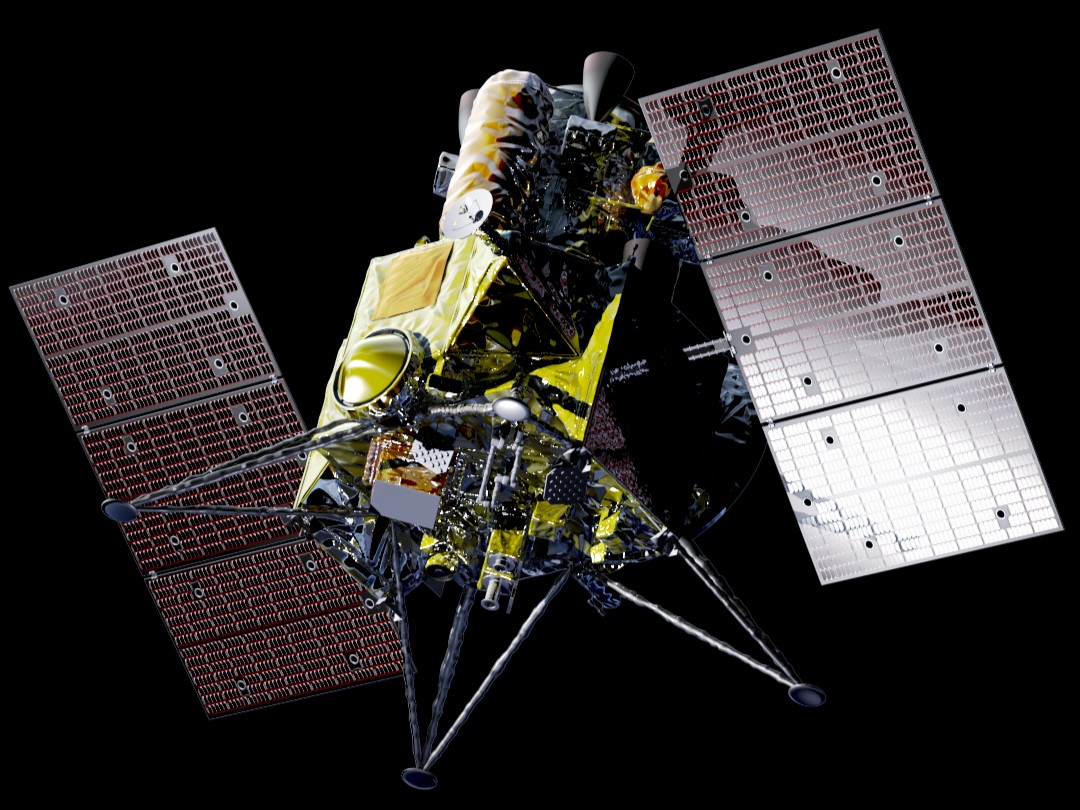
- Artist's concept of the Martian Moons eXploration (MMX) spacecraft
- Mission type: Sample-return mission
- Operator: JAXA
- COSPAR ID: 2026-236A
- SATCAT no.: 101109
- Website: www.mmx.jaxa.jp/en
- Mission duration: 5 years (planned); 22 days (elapsed)

Spacecraft properties
- Manufacturer: JAXA
- Launch mass: 4,480 kg (9,880 lb)

Start of mission
- Launch date: 19 October 2026, 19:41:03 UTC (20 October, 04:41:03 JST)
- Rocket: H3-24L, Flight 10
- Launch site: Tanegashima, LA‑Y2
- Contractor: Mitsubishi Heavy Industries

End of mission
- Disposal: Recovery (planned)
- Recovery date: 2031 (planned)
- Landing site: Woomera, Australia

Mars orbiter
- Orbital insertion: August 2027 (planned)
- Orbital departure: 2030 (planned)

Phobos lander
- Landing date: 2029 (planned)
- Return launch: 2030 (planned)
- Landing site: TBA
- Sample mass: ≥10 g (0.35 oz)
Instruments
- TENGOO: TElescopic Nadir imager for GeOmOrphology
- OROCHI: Optical RadiOmeter composed of CHromatic Imagers
- LIDAR: Light Detection and Ranging
- MIRS: MMX InfraRed Spectrometer
- MEGANE: Mars-moon Exploration with GAmma rays and NEutrons
- CMDM: Circum-Martian Dust Monitor
- MSA: Mass Spectrum Analyzer

Martian Moons eXploration (MMX) is a robotic space probe operated by Japan Aerospace Exploration Agency (JAXA) that launched in 2026, with a primary mission to bring back the first samples from Mars's larger moon Phobos. MMX will deploy a rover to the surface of Phobos, land and collect samples from the surface, and will also conduct Deimos flyby observations and monitor the atmosphere of Mars. The mission aims to provide key information to help determine whether the Martian moons are captured asteroids or the result of a larger body hitting Mars, in addition to several other scientific goals.

== Overview ==
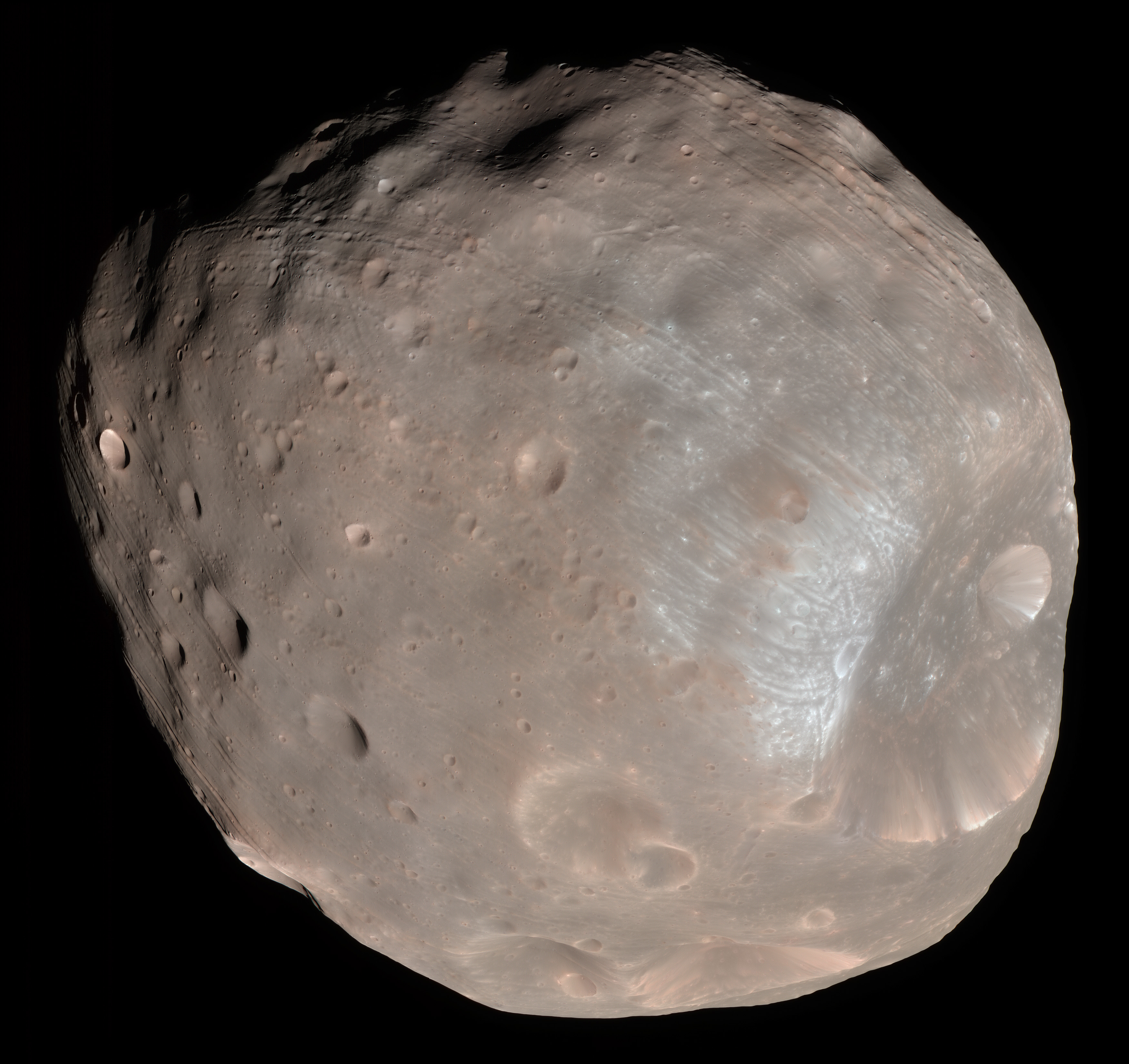
Phobos, the larger moon of Mars

The spacecraft will enter orbit around Mars in August 2027 before transferring to Phobos a month later. It will deliver the rover Idefix to the surface of Phobos in 2029, which among other missions will identify a suitable landing and sampling site for MMX. MMX will land once or twice in 2030 and collect regolith samples using a pneumatic sampling system. The mission is designed to return at least 10 g (0.35 oz) of material from the moon's surface. Several successive observations of the Martian atmosphere will be conducted during close approaches. After departing Phobos, the spacecraft will conduct several flybys of Deimos before releasing a return capsule for Earth in 2030, with sample return to reach Earth in 2031.

The spacecraft was launched on a H3-24L launch vehicle, with a total length of 63m, and a mass (not including payload) of 574 tonnes. The spacecraft payload has a total mass of 4,480 kg (9,880 lb), and consists of three modules: A propulsion module, with 1,840 kg (4,060 lb) of propellant, a return module with 1,190 kg (2,620 lb) of propellant, and an exploration module carrying scientific instruments including the Idefix rover.

Because Phobos and Deimos have insufficient mass to support conventional satellite orbits, MMX will operate in quasi-satellite orbits (QSOs), a class of trajectories that can remain stable for extended periods while staying in close proximity to the moons.

The MMX project is led by Yasuhiro Kawakatsu, Hisashi Otake, and Kiyoshi Kuramoto.

=== Mission purpose and selection of Phobos ===
Among the major scientific goals of the mission is to gain information on the formation of Mars's moons Phobos and Deimos (it is unknown whether Phobos and Deimos are captured asteroids or consolidated remnants of a larger body colliding with Mars), and to elucidate the nature of volatile compounds which migrated across the frost line to the rocky planets during the early development of the solar system.

Phobos was chosen for a sample return mission over Deimos for three primary reasons: firstly, the surface of Phobos exhibits a larger spectral density than Deimos which indicates possibly greater compositional diversity of the surface material; secondly, the likely presence on Phobos of material ejected from early impacts on Mars; and thirdly, the existence of a greater body of imagery of Phobos's surface at the time of mission planning gave better confidence on potential landing sites.

== International collaboration ==
MMX is led by JAXA, with participation from NASA, France's CNES, Germany's DLR, and the European Space Agency (ESA), who are providing scientific instruments.

NASA contributed a neutron and gamma-ray spectrometer called MEGANE (an acronym for Mars-moon Exploration with GAmma rays and NEutrons, which also means "eyeglasses" in Japanese). CNES provided the Near IR Spectrometer (NIRS4/MacrOmega). CNES is also contributing expertise in flight dynamics to plan the mission's orbiting and landing manoeuvres.

ESA provided deep space communication equipment – a transponder and power amplifier – and will provide ground station support from the Estrack network.

The sample-return capsule will land at the Woomera Complex in Australia.

== Spacecraft instruments ==
MMX has seven scientific instruments:

- TENGOO – Telescopic nadir imager for geomorphology, a narrow field camera for detailed terrain study.
- OROCHI – Optical radiometer composed of chromatic imagers, a wide field visible light camera.
- LIDAR – Light detection and ranging, uses a laser to reflect light from the moon's surface, to study surface altitude and albedo
- MIRS – MMX infrared spectrometer, a near-infrared observation device for characterizing the minerals that make up the moons of Mars. Developed in partnership with CNES, France
- MEGANE – (Megane means "eyeglasses" in Japanese) Mars-moon exploration with gamma rays and neutrons, a gamma-ray and neutron spectrometer developed by NASA, Johns Hopkins Applied Physics Laboratory, and Lawrence Livermore National Laboratory.
- CMDM – Circum-Martian dust monitor, a dust counting device for characterizing the environment around the Martian moons
- MSA – Mass spectrum analyzer, an instrument to study the ion environment around Mars

JAXA partnered with the Japan Broadcasting Corporation (NHK) to develop the "Super Hi-Vision Camera" which combines a 4K and 8K camera, making it the first time that Mars will be imaged in 8K resolution. Images will be regularly transmitted back to Earth with flight data, in order to recreate MMX exploration around Mars and its moons. The original image data will be stored in a recording device in MMX's return capsule and brought back to Earth as part of the sample-return portion of the mission.

The OROCHI and MIRS instruments will be used for spectroscopic imaging and mapping of the Martian atmosphere during close approaches.

The Gravity GradioMeter (GGM), Laser-Induced Breakdown Spectroscope (LIBS), and Mission Survival Module (MSM) were proposed as additional instruments.

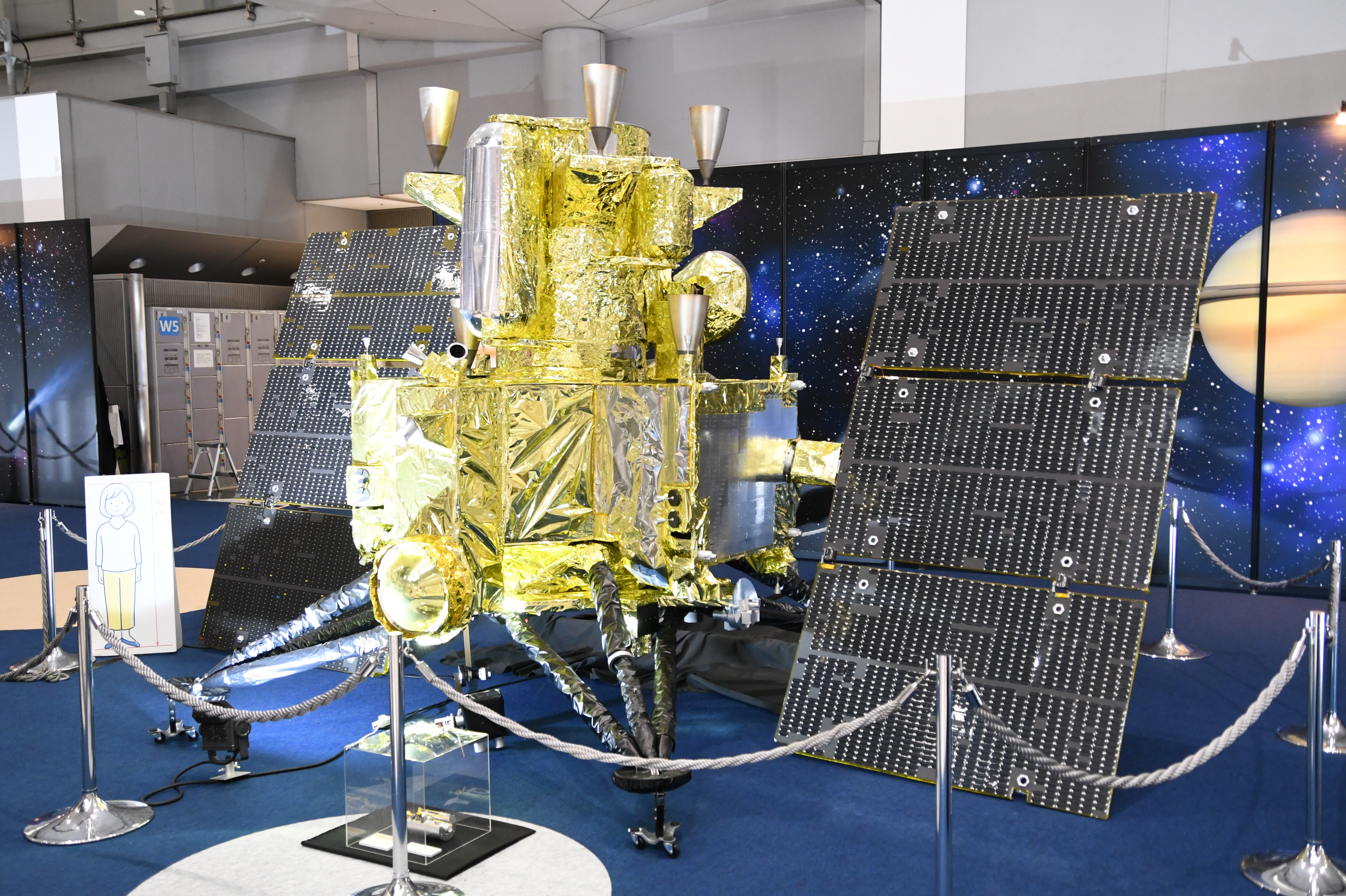
1/2 scale model

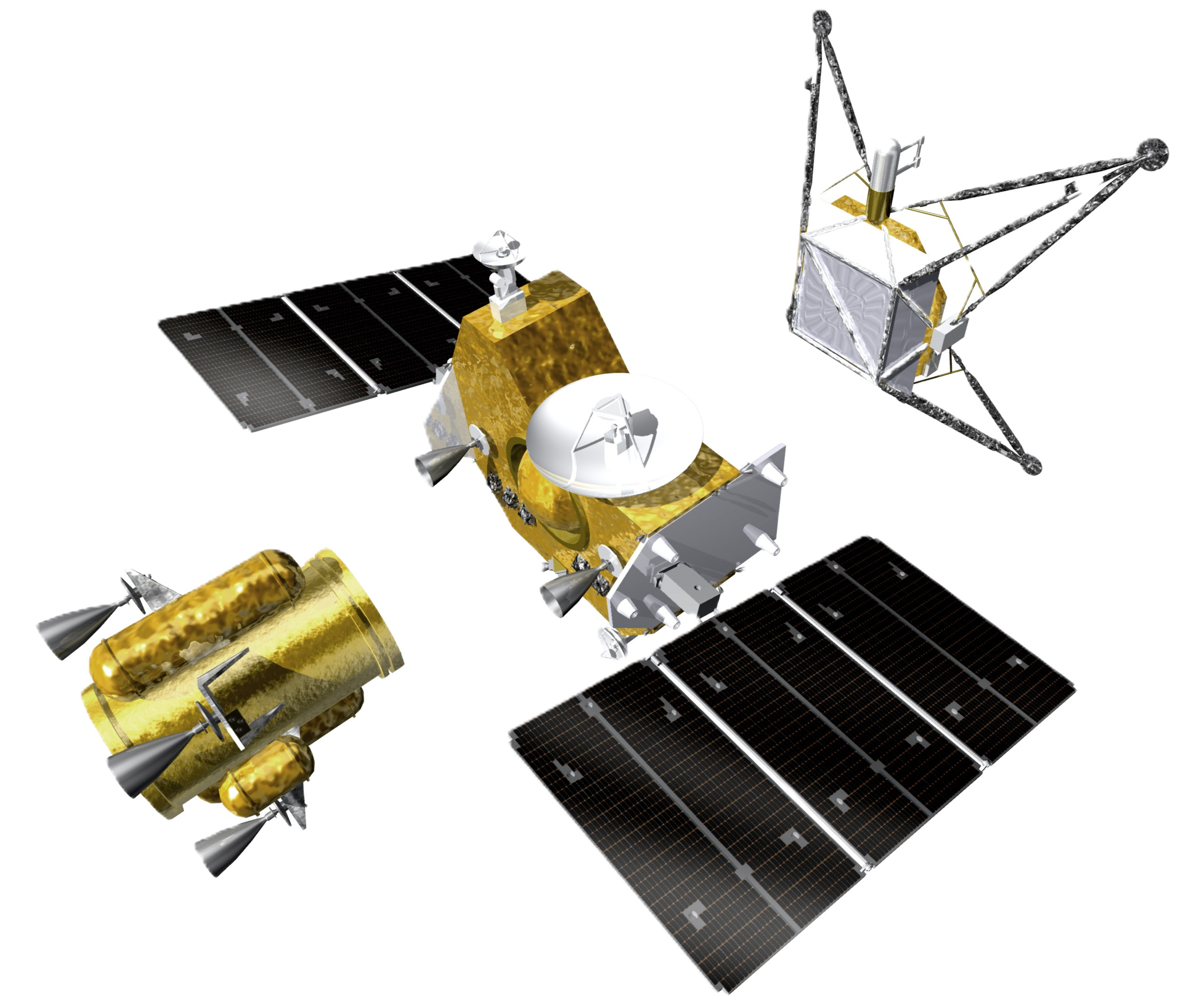
An older MMX design

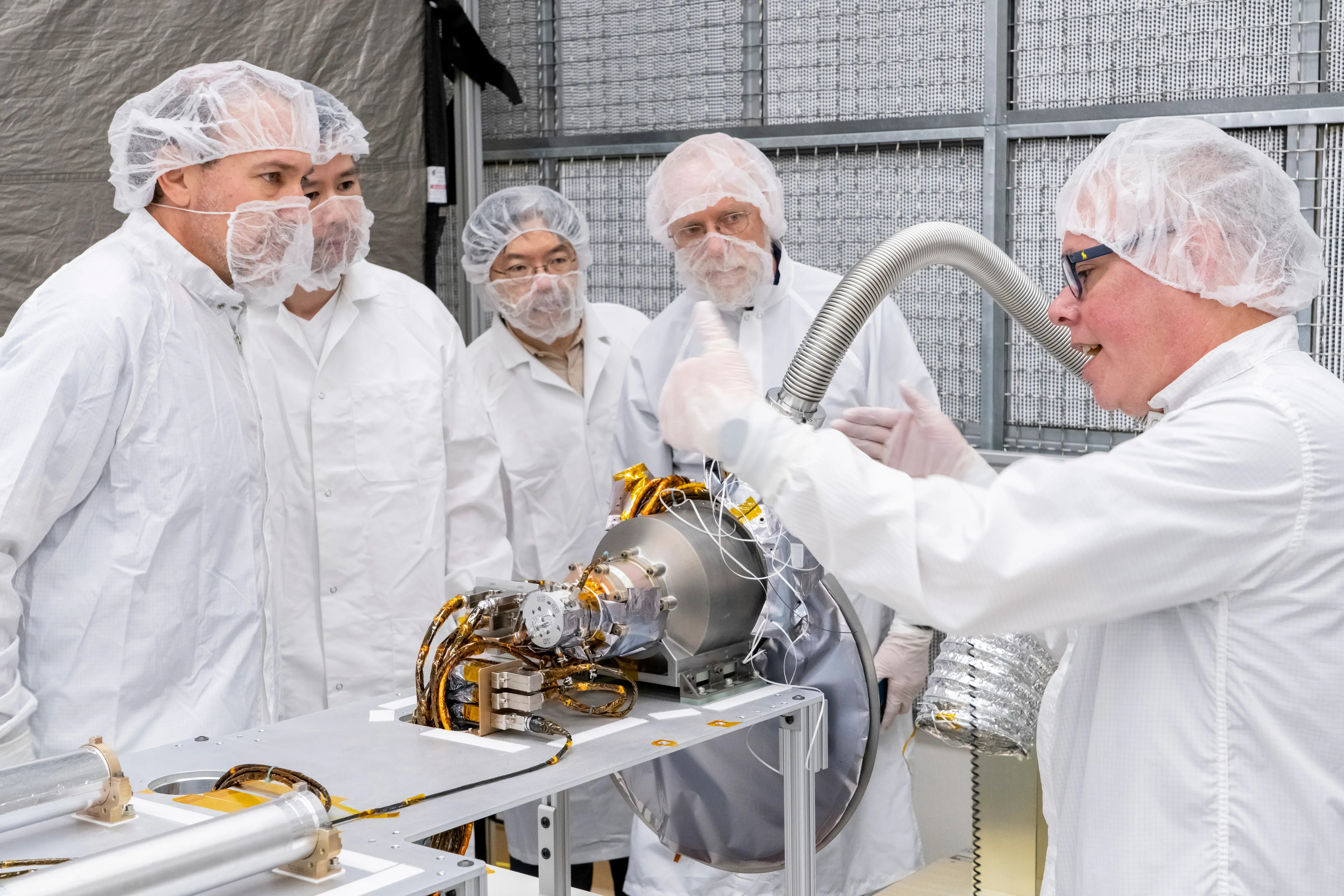
U.S. and Japanese team members with the gamma-ray spectrometer portion of the MEGANE instrument at Johns Hopkins APL.

== Idefix rover ==
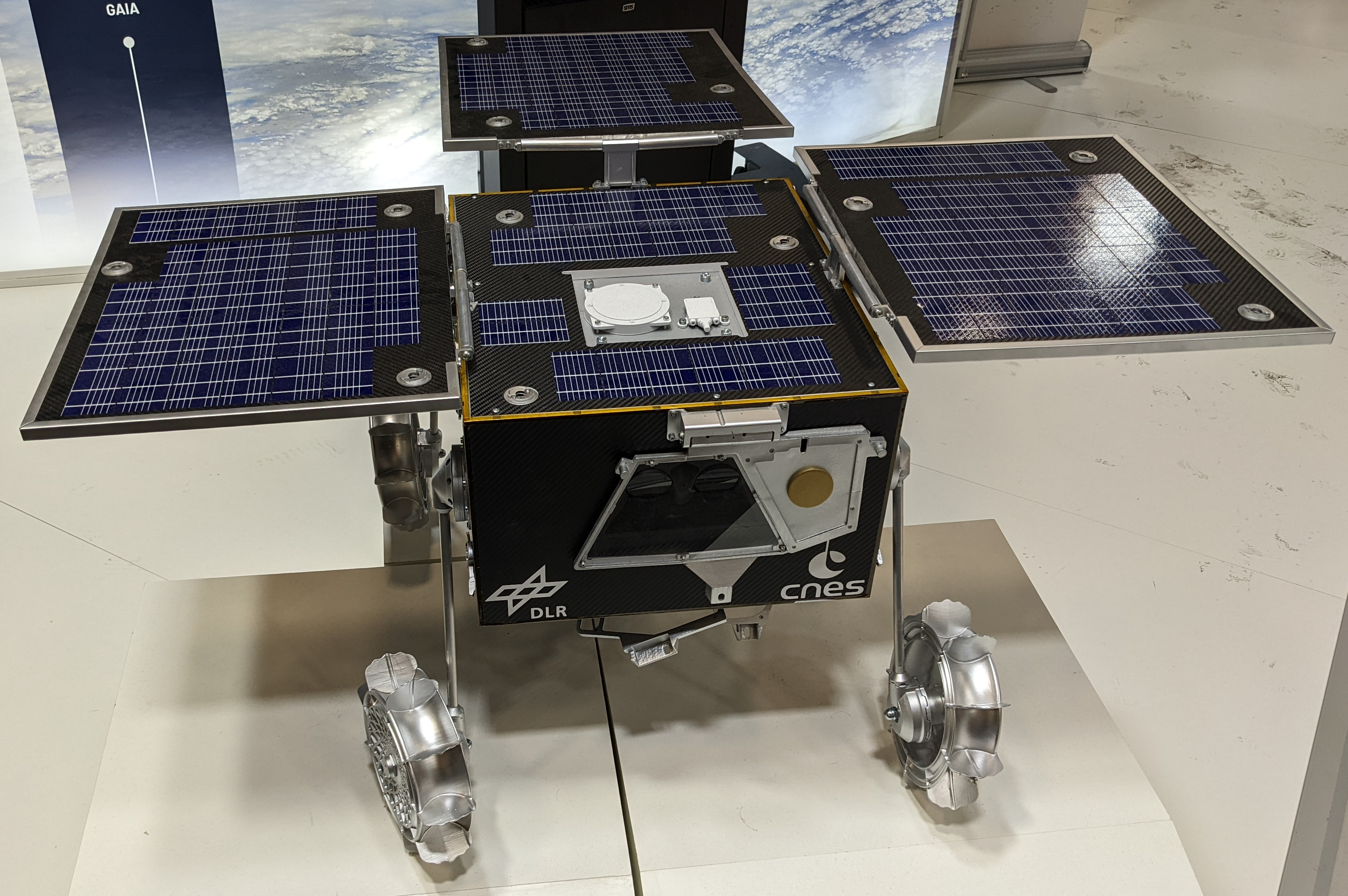
The IDEFIX rover

Following a study by the French CNES space agency, it was decided that the spacecraft will deliver a small rover provided by CNES and the German Aerospace Center (DLR). IDEFIX is a rover weighing less than 30 kg (66 lb), and is named after Idéfix, Obelix's dog in the French comic Asterix, (known as Dogmatix in the English translations). The name Idefix (without acute accent) is also used for the character in the German translation. Asterix is a popular comic in both France and Germany.

It will be equipped with cameras, a radiometer, and a Raman spectrometer for in-situ surface exploration. The instruments are two navigation cameras (NavCams), two cameras (WheelCams) "that will observe the interactions of the back and front wheels with the regolith", a Raman spectrometer (RAX) and a miniaturized radiometer (miniRad).

Its objectives are to touch the surface of Phobos, to check the behaviour of the surface under mechanical actions and to relay this information to Earth. It must also demonstrate that it is possible to use wheeled locomotion on a body with such low gravity. Finally, it will take measurements in situ, observing the ground of Phobos at a resolution of 100 μm, and moving around on it.

Due to the low gravity on Phobos of 0.0057 m/s^{2}, the rover will not require landing gear, and may bounce on the surface until it comes to rest. The descent of the rover will be instigated by a spring mechanism pushing it away from the MMX orbiter. The rover is expected to operate for 100 days. Its expected speed while traversing the surface is 1 mm per second.

== Sampling ==
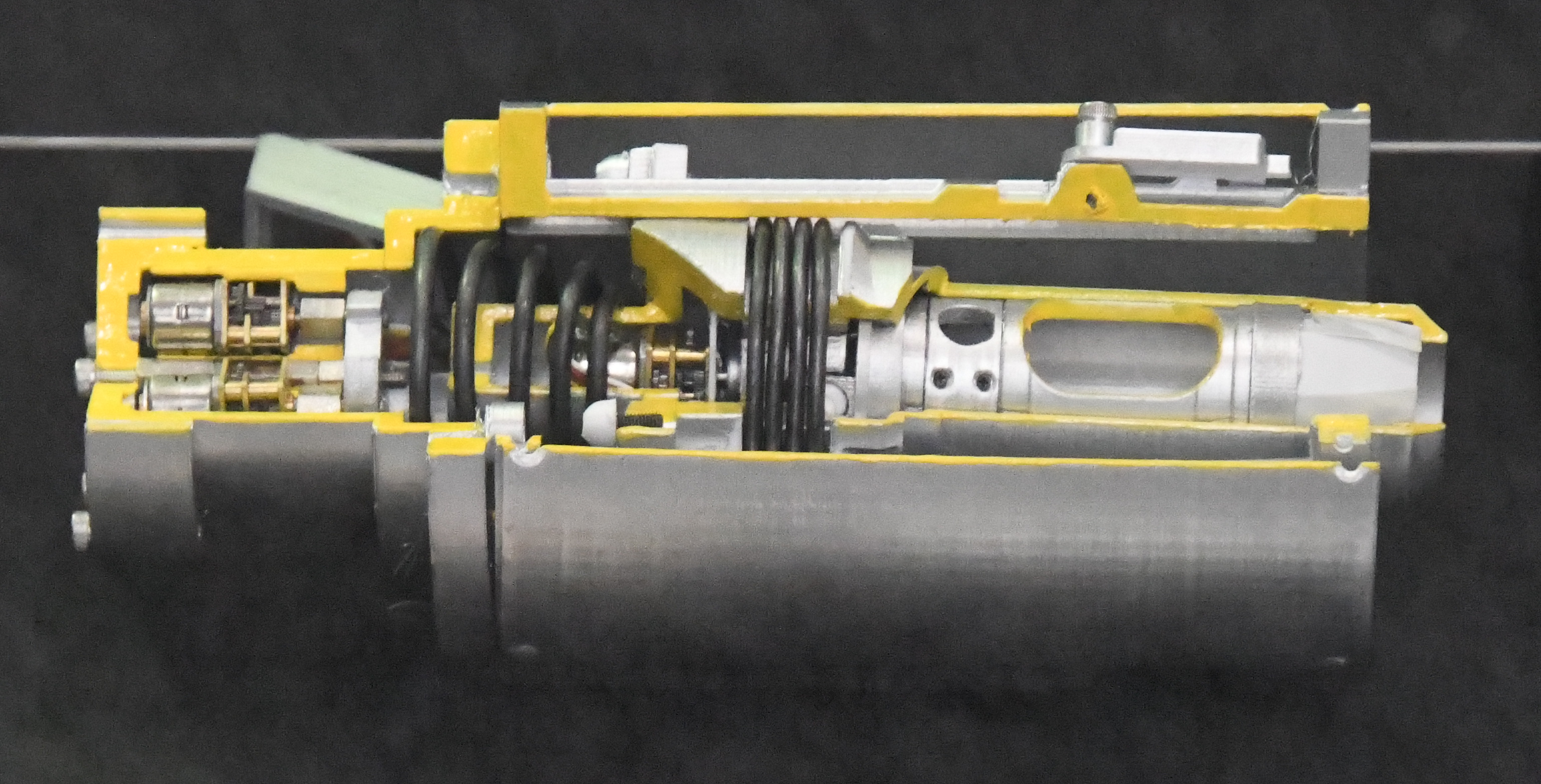
A cutaway of the spacecraft's sample collection corer

MMX's sampler is equipped with two sampling methods: the Coring Sampler (C-SMP) to gain regolith at depths deeper than 2 cm from the Phobos surface, and the Pneumatic Sampler (P-SMP) for samples from the Phobos surface. The robotic arm will collect regolith from the ground by shooting the C-SMP mechanism. The C-SMP mechanism is designed to rapidly perform subsurface sampling to collect over 10 grams of the regolith. It is equipped with an ejecting actuator that uses a special shape memory alloy, SCSMA. P-SMP is installed close to the footpad of the landing leg, and uses an air gun to puff pressurized gas, pushing about 10 grams of soil into the sample container. Both C-SMP and P-SMP can collect samples quickly because the entire sampling procedure is scheduled to be performed in only 2.5 hours.

After taking a sample, the robotic arm will transfer both C-SMP and P-SMP canisters to the sample return capsule. The spacecraft will then make several flybys of the smaller moon Deimos before carrying the Sample Return Capsule back to Earth, arriving in 2031.

A study published in 2026 claims, based on realistic constraints, that the mission has clear opportunities to discover organic residues.

== History ==
First announced 9 June 2015, JAXA and other Japanese government officials approved the MMX project to proceed into development on 19 February 2020. The probe arrived at Japan's Tanegashima Space Center on 31 March 2026, and was launched by an H3-24L rocket on 19 October 2026 at 19:41:03 UTC (20 October, 04:41:03 JST, local time at the launch site), during the year's launch window. This was the first time the H3 launch vehicle was used to send a craft on an interplanetary trajectory. The launch vehicle flew as planned, and the separation of the MMX spacecraft was later confirmed.

== See also ==
- Phobos program
- Fobos-Grunt
- Mars sample-return mission
