= Mars Exploration Program =

Uncrewed spaceflight program by NASA

Mars Exploration Program (MEP) is a long-term effort to explore the planet Mars, funded and led by NASA. Formed in 1993, MEP has made use of orbital spacecraft, landers, and Mars rovers to explore the possibilities of life on Mars, as well as the planet's climate and natural resources. The program is managed by NASA's Science Mission Directorate. As a result of 40% cuts to NASA's budget for fiscal year 2013, the Mars Program Planning Group (MPPG) was formed to help reformulate the MEP, bringing together leaders of NASA's technology, science, human operations, and science missions.

== Governance ==
First convening in October 1999, the Mars Exploration Program Analysis Group (MEPAG) enables the scientific community to provide input for the planning and prioritizing of the Mars Exploration Program. Mars exploration missions, as do most NASA missions, can be fairly costly. For example, NASA's Curiosity rover (landed on Mars in Aug 2012) has a budget exceeding $2.5 billion. NASA also has goals of collaborating with the European Space Agency (ESA) in order to conduct a mission involving returning a sample of Mars soil to Earth, which would likely cost at least $5 billion and take ten years to complete.

=== Objectives ===
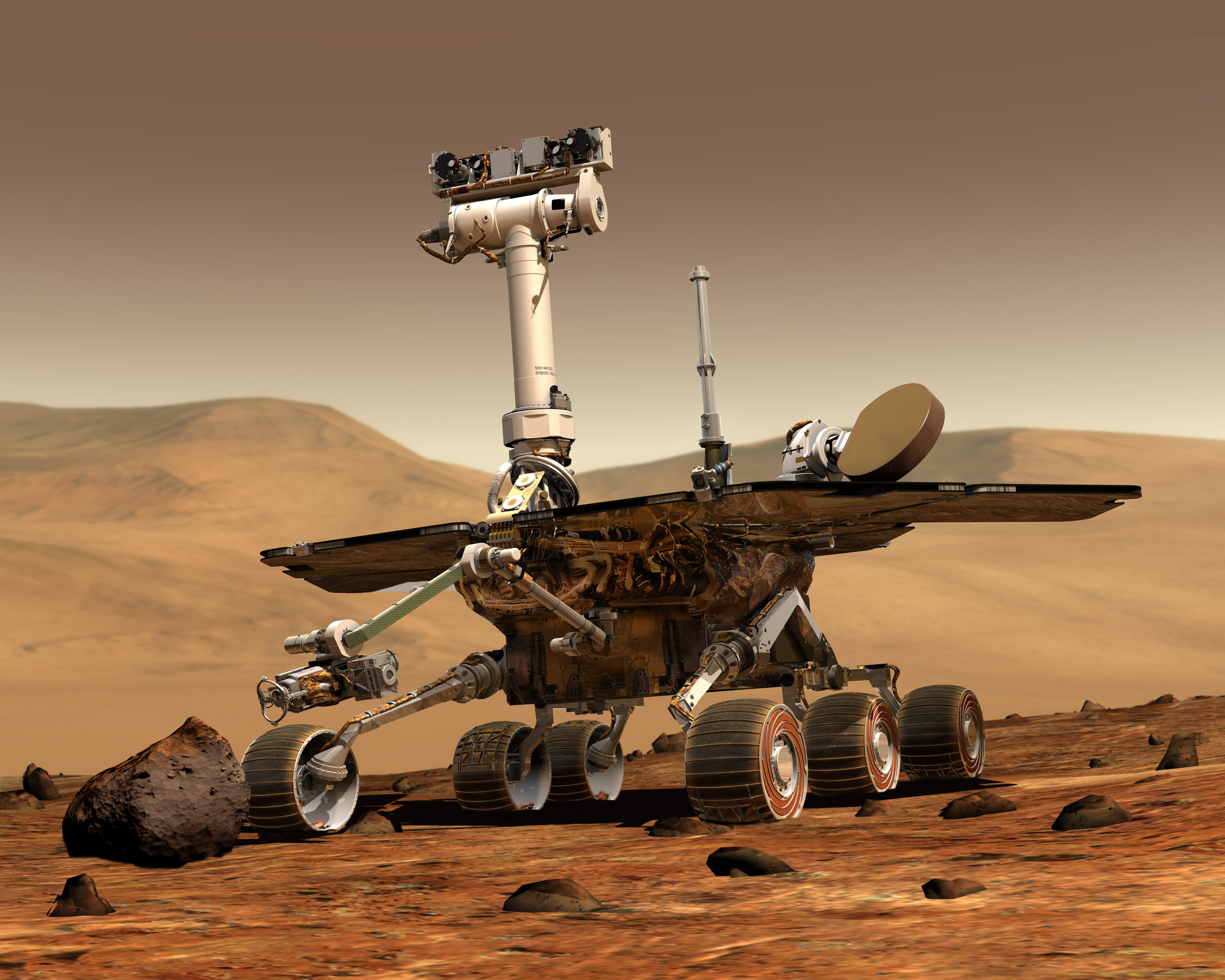
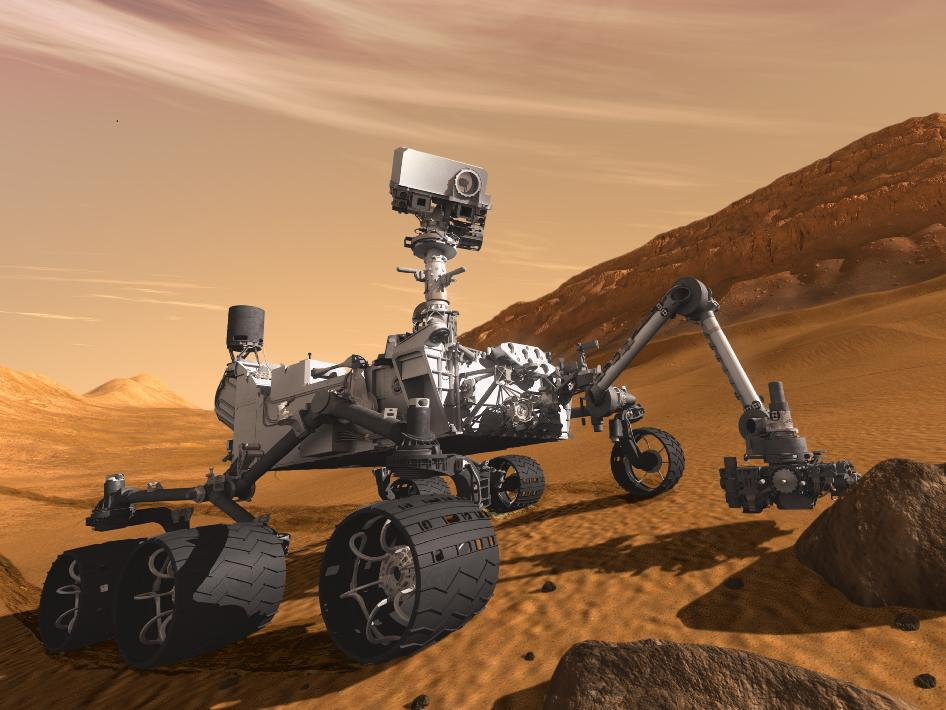
Astrobiology, climatology, and geology have been common themes in Mars Exploration Program missions, such as Mars Exploration Rover (left) and Mars Science Laboratory (right)

According to NASA, there are four broad goals of the MEP, all having to do with understanding the potential for life on Mars.

- Determine if life ever arose on Mars – In order to understand Mars's habitability potential, it must be determined whether or not there ever was life on Mars, which begins with assessing the planet's suitability for life. The main strategy regarding the MEP, nicknamed "Follow the Water," is the general idea that where water is present, there is life (at least in instances on Earth). It is likely that if life ever did arise on Mars, there would need to be a supply of water that was present for a substantial amount of time. Therefore, a prominent goal of the MEP is to look for places where water is, was, or could possibly be, such as dried up riverbeds, under the planetary surface, and in Mars's polar ice caps. Aside from water, life also needs sources of energy to survive. The abundance of superoxides makes life on the surface of Mars very unlikely, which essentially rules out sunlight as a possible source of energy for life. Therefore, alternative sources of energy must be searched for, such as geothermal and chemical energy. These sources, which are both used by life forms on Earth, could be used by microscopic life forms living under the Mars's surface. Life on Mars can also be searched for by finding signatures of past and present life or biosignatures. Relative carbon abundance and the location and forms that it can be found in can inform where and how life may have developed. Also, the presence of carbonate minerals, along with the fact that Mars's atmosphere is made up largely of carbon dioxide, would tell scientists that water may have been on the planet long enough to foster the development of life.
- Characterize the climate of Mars – Another goal of the MEP is to characterize both the current and past climate of Mars, as well as factors that influence climate change on Mars. Currently what is known is that the climate is regulated by seasonal changes of Mars's ice caps, movement of dust by the atmosphere, and the exchange of water vapor between the surface and the atmosphere. To understand these climatic phenomena means helping scientists more effectively model Mars's past climate, which brings a higher degree of understanding of the dynamics of Mars.
- Characterize the geology of Mars – The geology of Mars is differentiable from that of Earth by, among other things, its extremely large volcanoes and lack of crust movement. A goal of the MEP is to understand these differences from Earth along with the way that wind, water, volcanoes, tectonics, cratering and other processes have shaped the surface of Mars. Rocks can help scientists describe the sequence of events in Mars's history, tell whether there was an abundance of water on the planet through identifying minerals that are formed only in water, and tell if Mars once had a magnetic field (which would point toward Mars at one point being a dynamic Earth-like planet).
- Prepare for the human exploration of Mars – A human mission to Mars presents a massive engineering challenge. With Mars's surface containing superoxides and lacking a magnetosphere and an ozone layer to protect from radiation from the Sun, scientists would have to thoroughly understand as much of Mars's dynamics as possible before any action can be taken toward the goal of putting humans on Mars.

=== Challenges ===
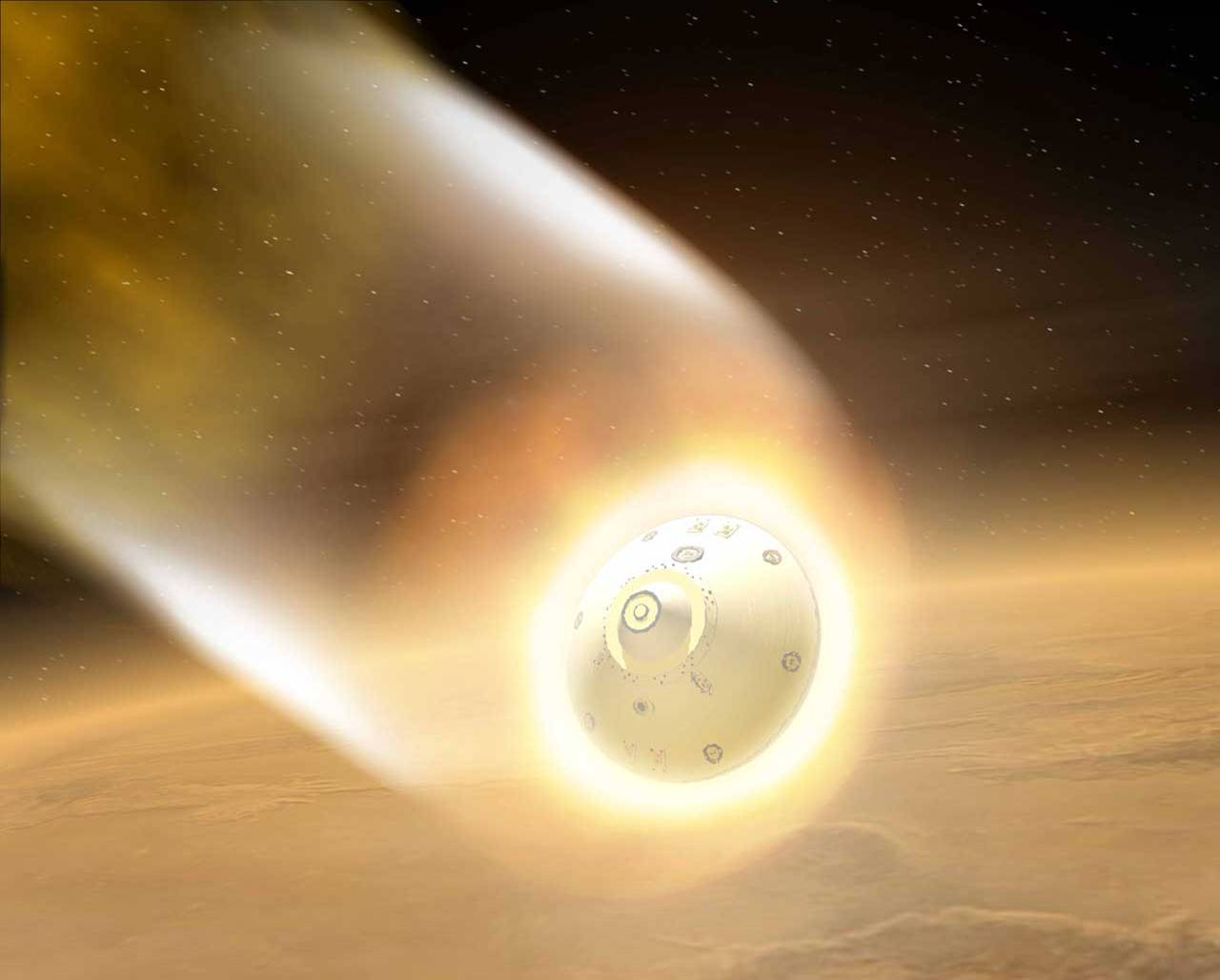
Mars's thinner atmosphere makes entry, descent, and landing operations of arriving in-situ surface spacecraft more challenging

Mars exploration missions have historically had some of the highest failure rates for NASA missions, which can be attributed to the immense engineering challenges of these missions as well as some bad luck, such as the America's Mars Polar Lander. With many of the goals of the MEP involving entry, descent, and landing of spacecraft (EDL) on the surface of Mars, factors like the planet's atmosphere, uneven surface terrain, and high cost of replicating Mars-like environments for testing come into play.

Compared to the Earth, the atmosphere of Mars is about 100 times thinner. As a result, if a landing craft were to descend into Mars's atmosphere, it would decelerate at a much lower altitude, and depending on the object's mass, may not have enough time to reach terminal velocity. In order to deploy super- or subsonic decelerators, velocity must be below a threshold or they will not be effective. Therefore, technologies must be developed so that a landing craft can be decelerated enough to allow adequate time for other necessary landing processes to be carried out before landing. Mars's atmosphere varies significantly over the course of a Mars year, which prevents engineers from being able to develop a system for EDL common among all missions. Frequently-occurring dust storms increase lower atmospheric temperature and lessen atmospheric density, which, coupled with the extremely variable elevations on Mars's surface, forces a conservative selection of a landing site in order to allow for sufficient craft deceleration. With Mars EDL sequences only lasting about 5–8 minutes, the associated systems must be unquestionably reliable. Ideally, this would be verified by data obtained by carrying out large-scale tests of various components of the EDL systems on Earth-based testing. However, the costs of reproducing environments in which this data would be relevant in terms of Mars's environment are considerably high, resulting in testing being purely ground-based or simulating results of tests involving technologies derived from past missions.

The often uneven and rocky terrain of Mars makes landing on, and traversing, the planet's surface a significant challenge

The surface of Mars is extremely uneven, containing rocks, mountainous terrain, and craters. For a landing craft, the ideal landing area would be flat and debris-free. Since this terrain is almost impossible to find on Mars, landing gear must be very stable and have enough ground clearance to prevent problems with tipping over and instability upon landing. In addition, the deceleration systems of these landers would need to include thrusters that are pointed at the ground. These thrusters must be designed so that they only need to be active for an extremely short amount of time; if they are active and pointed at rocky ground for more than a few milliseconds, they start to dig trenches, launch small rocks up into the landing gear, and cause destabilizing backpressure to be forced upon the lander.

Finding an adequate landing site means being able to estimate rock size from orbit. The technology to accurately determine rock size under 0.5 meters in diameter from orbit has not yet been developed, so instead rock size distribution is inferred from its relationship to thermal inertia, based on thermal response of the landing site measured by satellites currently orbiting Mars. The Mars Reconnaissance Orbiter also helps this cause in the sense that its cameras can see rocks larger than 0.5 m in diameter. Along with the possibility of the lander tipping over on sloped surfaces, large topographical features like hills, mesas, craters and trenches pose the problem of interference with ground sensors. Radar and Doppler radar can falsely measure altitude during descent and the algorithms that target the touchdown point of the lander can be "tricked" into releasing the lander too early or late if the craft passes over mesas or trenches while descending.

== History ==
=== Background ===
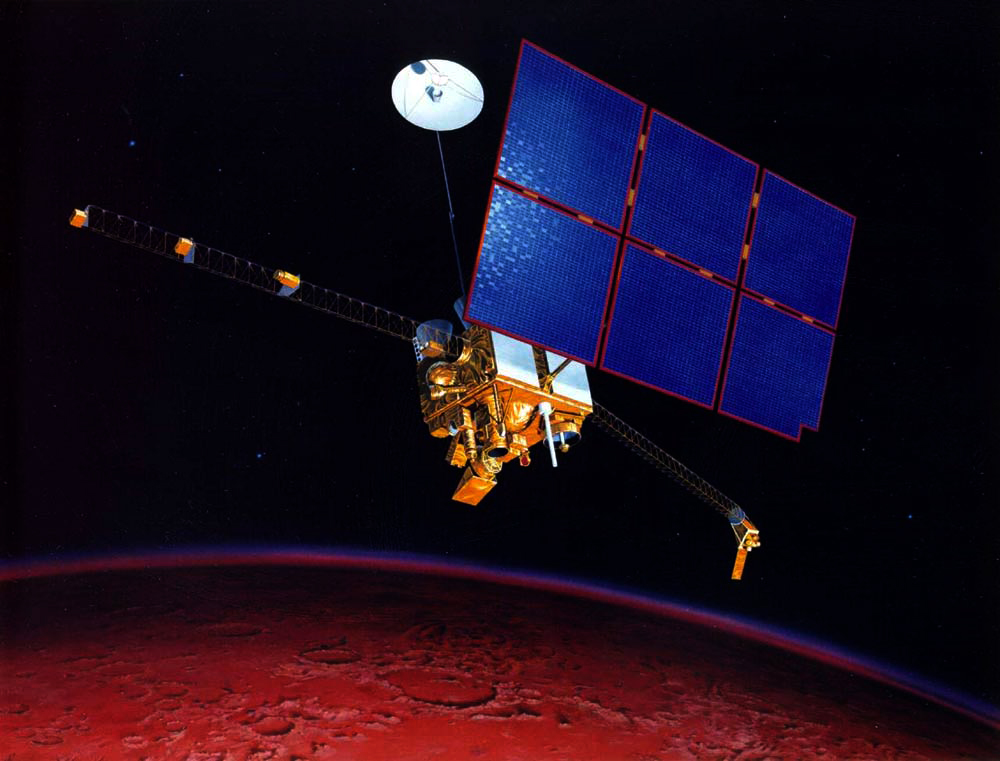
The loss of Mars Observer in 1993 prompted the formation of a cohesive Mars Exploration Program

While it was observed in ancient times by the Babylonians, Egyptians, Greeks, and others, it was not until the invention of the telescope in the 17th century that Mars was studied in depth. The first attempt at sending a probe to the surface of Mars, nicknamed "Marsnik 1," was by the USSR in 1960. The probe failed to reach Earth orbit, and the mission was ultimately unsuccessful. Failure to complete mission objectives has been common in missions designed to explore Mars; roughly two-thirds of all spacecraft destined for Mars have failed before any observation could begin. The Mars Exploration Program itself was formed officially in the wake of the failed Mars Observer in September 1992, which had been NASA's first Mars mission since the Viking 1 and Viking 2 projects in 1975. The spacecraft, which was based on a modified Earth-orbiting commercial communications satellite (i.e., SES's Astra 1A satellite), carried a payload of instruments designed to study the geology, geophysics, and climate of Mars from orbit. The mission ended in August 1993 when communications were lost three days before the spacecraft had been scheduled to enter orbit.

=== 2000s ===
In the 2000s, NASA established the Mars Scout Program as a campaign under the Mars Exploration Program to send a series of small, low-cost robotic missions to Mars, competitively selected from innovative proposals by the scientific community with a budget cap of US$485 million. The first robotic spacecraft in this program was Phoenix, which utilized a lander originally manufactured for the canceled Mars Surveyor 2001 mission. Phoenix was one of four finalists selected out of 25 proposals. The four finalists were Phoenix, MARVEL, SCIM (Sample Collection for Investigation of Mars), and the ARES ("Aerial Regional-scale Environmental Survey") Mars airplane. SCIM was a sample return mission that would have used a free-return trajectory and aerogel to capture Mars dust and return it to Earth (see also: the Stardust mission). MARVEL was an orbiter that would have searched for volcanism as well as analyzed various components of the Mars atmosphere. The name is an acronym for Mars Volcanic Emission and Life Scout, and it was intended to detect gases from life if it was there. ARES was an aircraft concept for Mars to study the lower atmosphere and surface. On September 15, 2008, NASA announced that it had selected MAVEN for the second mission. This mission was budgeted at no more than US$475 million. After only two selections, the NASA Science Directorate announced in 2010 that Mars Scout would be incorporated into the Discovery program, which was re-scoped to allow Mars missions to be proposed. InSight, a Mars seismology and geology mission, was ultimately chosen as the twelfth Discovery program mission.

Proposed Mars Scout program missions (2003–10)
Mission Name	Description
The Great Escape (TGE)	The mission would have directly determined the basic processes in Martian atmospheric evolution by measuring the structure and dynamics of the upper atmosphere. In addition, potentially biogenic atmospheric constituents such as methane would have been measured. The principal investigator is Alan Stern, Southwest Research Institute, Boulder, Colorado. Southwest Research Institute, San Antonio, would have provided project management.
Artemis	This mission would launch up to four saucer-shaped landers, two feet (0.61m) in diameter, from a "mother ship" orbiting Mars. Each would parachute onto the surface, analyzing the soil and atmosphere. Two of the four landers would be targeted at the polar regions.
ARES	This mission concept proposed to send an unmanned airplane into the Martian atmosphere to observe the planet.
Chronos	This mission would consist of a probe designed to melt through a polar ice cap using heated jets. It would travel up to 100 yards (91m) below the surface, analyzing the melted water to determine the climatic history of Mars.
KittyHawk	This mission would create three or four winged gliders with approximately six-foot (1.83m) wingspans and would explore the Valles Marineris canyon system. The gliders would carry infrared spectrometers and cameras.
MOO	With infrared telescopes on Earth and a spectrometer on the Mars Express Orbiter, methane was discovered in the Martian atmosphere. The presence of methane on Mars is very intriguing, since as an unstable gas it indicates that there must be an active source of the gas on the planet. The latest research suggests that the methane destruction lifetime is as long ~4 Earth years and as short as ~0.6 Earth years. In either case, the destruction lifetime for methane is much shorter than the timescale (~350 years) estimated for photochemical (UV radiation) destruction. The Mars Organics Observer would use an orbiter to characterize the Martian methane: where it is being emitted, how much is being emitted and how often it is being emitted.
The Naiades	Named for nymphs of springs, lakes, and rivers from Greek mythology, this mission would send two landers to a region which likely holds groundwater. The landers would search for the groundwater using low-frequency electromagnetics and other instruments.
SCIM	A sample return mission that would briefly pass into the Martian atmosphere to scoop up about 1000 dust grains and a few liters of air without slowing from escape velocity.
THOR	Similar to NASA's Deep Impact, this mission would impact two copper spheres into Mars's surface to create craters in a region known to have water ice, and maybe liquid water, a few meters under the surface. An accompanying orbiter would analyze the craters from orbit. Although this mission was not selected, ice was later observed in fresh natural impacts.
Urey	This mission calls for a lander/rover pair designed to analyze the ages of rocks. It would be targeted for the Cerberus Highlands region, and would look for specific minerals to help scientists compare the cratering of Mars with that of the Moon.
MARVEL	Orbiter with spectrometers would look for volcanic emissions and life
CryoScout	Melt probe for ice caps
Pascal	24 mini weather stations. Also proposed in the Discovery Program.
MEO	Mars Environmental Orbiter—study atmosphere and hydrology
MACO	Mars Atmospheric Constellation Observatory—a network of microsatellites study the atmosphere
MSR	Mars Scout Radar—Synthetic Aperture Radar (SAR) to study sub-surface

=== 2010s ===
A significant budget cut of US$300 million to NASA's planetary science division occurred in FY2013, which prompted the cancellation of the agency's participation in ESA's ExoMars program, as well as a reevaluation of the Mars Exploration Program as a whole. In February 2012, the Mars Program Planning Group (MPPG) was convened in Washington, D.C. to discuss candidate mission concepts for the 2018 or 2020 launch window, in an initiative known as Mars Next Generation. The purpose of the MPPG was to develop foundations for a program-level architecture for robotic exploration of Mars that is consistent with the Obama administration's challenge of sending humans to Mars orbit in the decade of the 2030s, yet remain responsive to the primary scientific goals of the 2011 NRC Decadal Survey for Planetary Science. The MPPG used non-consensus, individual inputs of both NASA civil servant and contractor employees, with resulting decisions being the exclusive responsibility of NASA.

The immediate focus of the MPPG was on the collection of multiple mission concept options for the 2018 and 2020 Mars launch window. At a budget envelope of 700 million USD, including a launch vehicle, it was presumed that the mission would be limited to an orbiter. Near-term ideas were taken into consideration for early mission planning in the 2018-2024 timeframe, while mid- to longer-term ideas informed program-level architecture planning for 2026 and beyond. Strategies explored for such a mission included a sample-return mission where soil samples are placed in Mars orbit in the late 2020s or early 2030s, an in-situ soil analysis, and a study of Mars's surface and deep interior preceding a sample-return mission and/or crewed mission. Concept missions that were studied that fit the budget requirement of US$700 million to US$800 million included the Next Mars Orbiter (NeMO) to replace aging satellites' telecommunication services, and a stationary lander to investigate and select samples suitable for a later return to Earth. Prior to the findings of the MPPG, the House Appropriations Committee's Commerce-Justice-Science subcommittee approved a budget in April 2012 that reinstated US$150 million to the Planetary Science budget, with a caveat that a sample-return mission be mandated. The MPPG's final report was drafted in August 2012 and published in September. Ultimately endorsing a sample-return mission, the recommendation influenced NASA's FY2014 budget process.

== Missions ==
Mission	Patch	Vehicle	Launch	Orbital insertion/ Landing Date	Launch vehicle (Note: Serial number displayed in parentheses.)	Status	Duration
Mars Global Surveyor		MGS	November 7, 1996, 17:00 UTC	September 11, 1997 01:17 UTC	Delta II 7925	Completed	3,647 days
Mars Pathfinder (Note: Mission conducted as part of the Discovery Program.)		Mars Pathfinder	December 4, 1996 06:58 UTC	July 4, 1997 16:57 UTC	Delta II 7925	Completed	297 days
Mars Pathfinder		Sojourner	December 4, 1996 06:58 UTC	July 4, 1997 16:57 UTC	Delta II 7925	Completed	297 days
Mars Surveyor '98		Mars Climate Orbiter	December 11, 1998, 18:45 UTC	September 23, 1999 09:00 UTC(failed)	Delta II 7425	Failure	286 days
Mars Surveyor '98		Mars Polar Lander	January 3, 1999, 20:21 UTC	December 3, 1999 20:15 UTC(failed)	Delta II 7425	Failure	334 days
2001 Mars Odyssey		Mars Odyssey	April 7, 2001, 15:02 UTC	October 24, 2001 12:21 UTC	Delta II 7925-9.5	Operational	9,350 days
Mars Exploration Rover		Spirit	June 10, 2003, 17:58 UTC	January 4, 2004 04:35 UTC	Delta II 7925-9.5	Completed	2,695 days
Mars Exploration Rover		Opportunity	July 7, 2003, 03:18 UTC	January 25, 2004 05:05 UTC	Delta II 7925H-9.5	Completed	5,498 days
Mars Reconnaissance Orbiter		MRO	August 12, 2005, 11:43 UTC	March 10, 2006 21:24 UTC	Atlas V 401 (AV-007)	Operational	7,759 days
Phoenix (Note: Mission conducted as part of the Mars Scout Program.)		Phoenix	August 4, 2007 09:26 UTC	May 25, 2008 23:53 UTC	Delta II 7925	Completed	457 days
Mars Science Laboratory		Curiosity	November 26, 2011, 15:02 UTC	August 6, 2012 05:17 UTC	Atlas V 541 (AV-028)	Operational	5,099 days
MAVEN		MAVEN	November 18, 2013, 18:28 UTC	September 22, 2014 02:24 UTC	Atlas V 401 (AV-038)	Completed	4,401 days
InSight		InSight	May 5, 2018, 11:05 UTC	November 26, 2018 19:52 UTC	Atlas V 401 (AV-078)	Completed	2,908 days
Mars 2020		Perseverance	July 30, 2020, 11:50 UTC	February 18, 2021 20:55 UTC	Atlas V 541 (AV-088)	Operational	2,093 days
Mars 2020		Ingenuity	July 30, 2020, 11:50 UTC	February 18, 2021 20:55 UTC	Atlas V 541 (AV-088)	Completed	1,026 days
Mars Telecommunications Network		MTO	2028		TBD	Planned	N/A
SkyFall		3 x SkyFall helicopters	2028			Proposed	N/A
International Mars Ice Mapper		I-MIM	2031	2032	TBD	Proposed	N/A
MSR Sample Retrieval Lander		SRL	TBA		TBD	Cancelled	N/A

=== Timeline ===
Launch windows for a Martian expedition occur approximately every two years and two months (specifically 780 days, which is Mar's synodic period with respect to Earth).

== See also ==
- Exploration of Mars
- List of missions to Mars
- List of NASA missions
