= NASA's Space Place =

Educational website for children

NASA Space Place
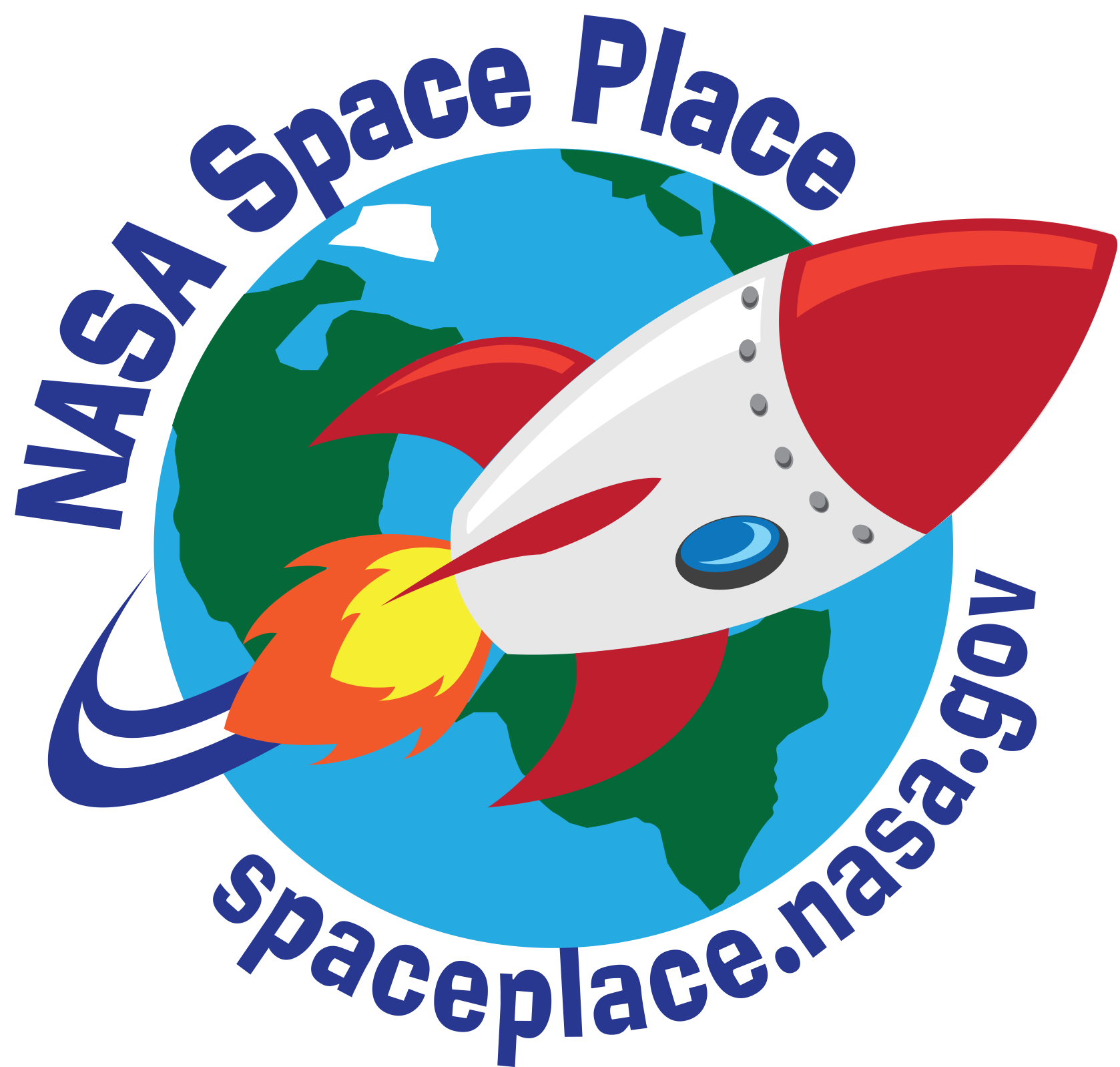
- Logo for NASA Space Place Program
- Website type: Educational
- Founded: 1998
- Website: https://spaceplace.nasa.gov

NASA Space Place is an educational website about space and Earth science targeting upper-elementary aged children. Launched in 1998, it was the first NASA website to create content about multiple missions directly for children. It serves as the children's portion of the NASA Science Mission Directorate website.

The site includes informative articles, hands-on activities, and interactive web games. In addition content geared toward children, the site contains resources for parents and educators. It was one of the first NASA websites to produce a companion Spanish language site. Space Place is produced by a team at the Jet Propulsion Laboratory.

== Content ==
Content on Space Place is divided into six subject matter categories: Universe, Sun, Earth, Solar System, Science and Technology, and Educators. Users can also sort material by articles, activities, and games.

Over 40 missions are represented on the Space Place. Missions that have joined Space Place include the NASA/ESA Cassini-Huygens mission, NASA's Galaxy Evolution Explorer, Galileo, Juno, and Mars Exploration Program missions, and ESA's Rosetta mission.

== Mobile products ==
Space Place has a mobile companion application named Space Place Prime, which highlights material on the Space Place website, as well as popular NASA images and videos.

The Space Place program has produced games for the iPad and iPhone, including Comet Quest, about the Rosetta mission, and Satellite Insight, about NOAA's GOES-R series of weather satellites.

== Outreach ==
The Space Place program produces a monthly kids' column about space that is run in many newspapers nationwide and contributes a monthly newsletter column to numerous astronomy and meteorology clubs. The program also distributes educational materials to museum partners across the United States, which feature them in public displays.
