= International Mars Ice Mapper Mission =

Proposed NASA-led orbiter mission to Mars

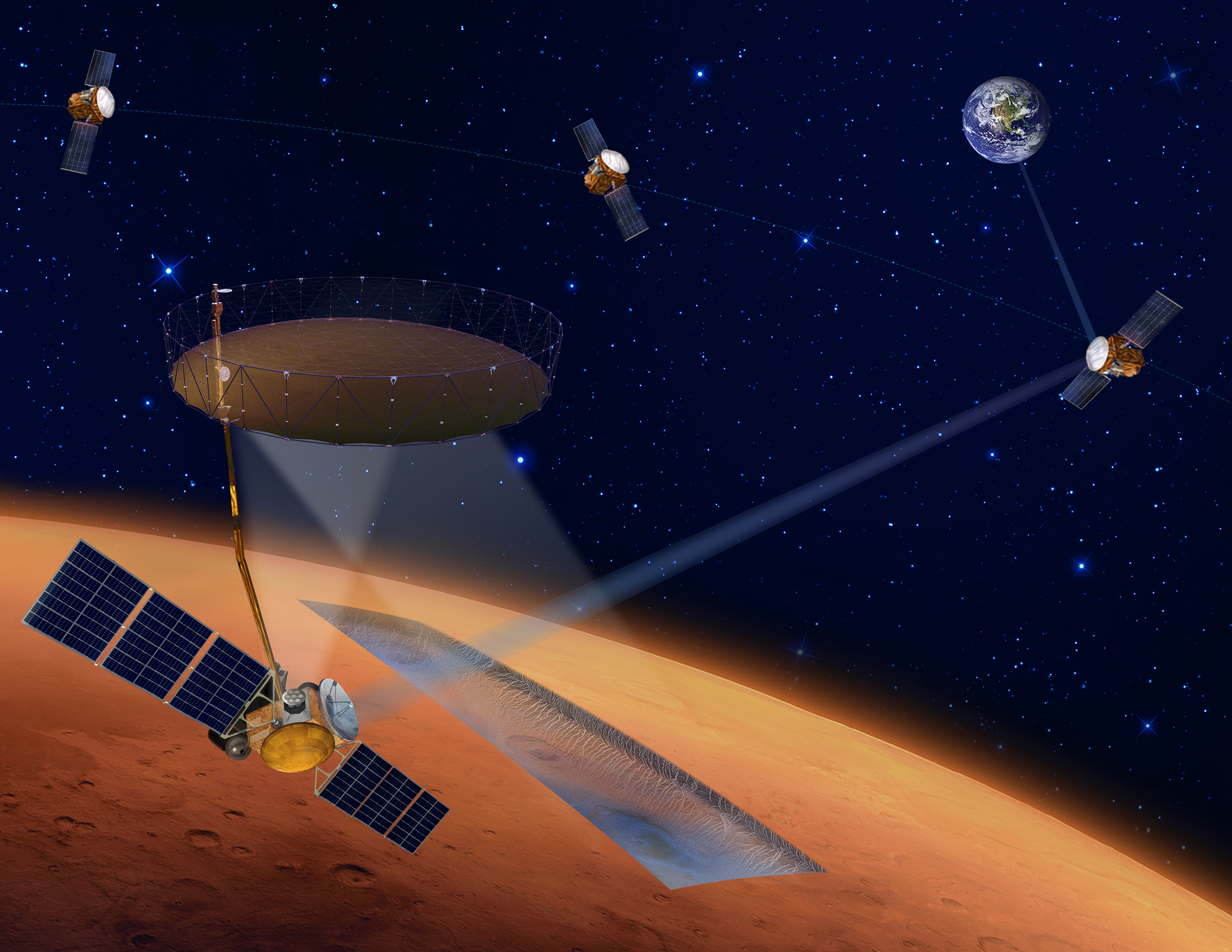
- Artist's concept of I-MIM orbiting Mars alongside three supporting communications orbiters at higher altitudes.
- Names: I-MIM; Mars Exploration Ice Mapper
- Mission type: Mars orbiter
- Operator: NASA / JAXA / CSA / ASI
- Mission duration: 2 years (planned)

Start of mission
- Launch date: 2031–2033
- Rocket: TBD
- Launch site: Cape Canaveral

Orbital parameters
- Reference system: Areocentric
- Periareon altitude: 250–320 km (160–200 mi)
- Apoareon altitude: 250–320 km (160–200 mi)
- Inclination: 74.0°
- Period: 110.0 minutes

The International Mars Ice Mapper Mission (I-MIM) is a proposed Mars orbiter being developed by NASA, Japan Aerospace Exploration Agency (JAXA), the Canadian Space Agency (CSA), and the Italian Space Agency (ASI). As the mission concept evolves, there may be opportunities for other space agency and commercial partners to join the mission. The goal of the orbiter is the quantification of extent and volume of water ice in non-polar regions of Mars. The results are intended to support future Mars missions, especially with respect to the search for habitable environments and accessible In situ resource utilization (ISRU) resources. The International-Mars Ice Mapper is an "exploration precursor mission", comparing it to the Lunar Reconnaissance Orbiter (LRO) mission. The mission was envisioned to be launched as early as 2026. However, in March 2022, it was revealed in its fiscal year 2023 budget proposal that the US government would terminate NASA financial support for the Mars Ice Mapper, casting the project's future into uncertainty.

== Mission ==
The mission is to search for ice deposits under the surface of Mars, precursor for human missions there. By identifying locations where water ice may exist within 5-10 meters of the surface and thus could be accessed by crewed expeditions. The mission plans to scan specific locations on the Martian surface below 2 km (1.2 mi) elevation (to enable entry, descent and landing). The target areas for radar scans are between 25° and 40° northern latitude and 25° and 40° southern latitude. The upper limit of 40° was chosen to have favorable conditions for solar arrays. The lower bound of 25° is intended to maximize the proximity of locating ground ice (since availability of ground ice generally decreases toward the equator due to increased insolation).

The ice-mapping mission could help the agency identify potential science objectives for initial human missions to Mars, which are expected to be designed for about 30 days of exploration on the surface. For example, identifying and characterizing accessible water ice could lead to human-tended science, such as ice coring to support the search for life. Mars Ice Mapper also could provide a map of water-ice resources for later human missions with longer surface expeditions, as well as help meet exploration engineering constraints, such as avoidance of rock and terrain hazards. Mapping shallow water ice could also support supplemental high-value science objectives related to Martian climatology and geology.

== Science ==
Beyond promoting scientific observations while the orbiter completes its reconnaissance work, the agency partners will explore mission-enabling rideshare opportunities as part of their next phase of study. All science data from the mission would be made available to the international science community for both planetary science and Mars reconnaissance. This approach is similar to what NASA is doing at the Moon under the Artemis program – sending astronauts to lunar South Pole, where ice is trapped in the permanently shadowed regions of the pole.

Access to water ice would also be central to scientific investigations on the surface of Mars that are led by future human explorers. Such explorers may one day core, sample, and analyze the ice to better understand the record of climatic and geologic change on Mars and its astrobiological potential, which could be revealed through signs of preserved ancient microbial life or even the possibility of living organisms, if Mars ever harbored life. Ice is also a critical natural resource that could eventually supply hydrogen and oxygen for fuel. These elements could also provide resources for backup life support, civil engineering, mining, manufacturing, and, eventually, agriculture on Mars. Transporting water from Earth to deep space is extremely costly, so a local resource is essential to sustainable surface exploration.

"In addition to supporting plans for future human missions to Mars, learning more about subsurface ice will bring significant opportunities for scientific discovery", said Eric Ianson, NASA Planetary Science Division Deputy Director and Mars Exploration Program Director. "Mapping near-surface water ice would reveal an as-yet hidden part of the Martian hydrosphere and the layering above it, which can help uncover the history of environmental change on Mars and lead to our ability to answer fundamental questions about whether Mars was ever home to microbial life or still might be today".

Mars has been a primary target for robotic exploration and the search for ancient life in the Solar System. Mars Ice Mapper would complement surface missions on the planet, including the Perseverance rover that landed on February 18, 2021, following a seven-month journey in space. NASA and the European Space Agency (ESA) also recently announced they are moving forward with the Mars sample-return mission.

== Spacecraft ==
The CSA would provide the radar instrument, JAXA the spacecraft bus and ASI the communications subsystem for the spacecraft. NASA would be responsible for overall mission management and for providing the launch of the spacecraft. The mission will cost US$185 million.

NASA included an illustration of Mars Ice Mapper communicating with three spacecraft in Mars orbit, acting as communications relays back to Earth. The agency has previously discussed developing a communications satellite network at Mars, perhaps through public-private partnerships, to support Mars Ice Mapper.

In March 2024, Thales Alenia Space signed a €22 million Phase B1 contract with the Italian Space Agency to develop the spacecraft's communications subsystems, following the Phase A contract previously awarded to the company in 2021.

== Instrument ==
The mission concept plans to utilize Synthetic-aperture radar, based on technology used by the Canadian RADARSAT satellite constellation.

The radar has the following technical specification:

- Frequency: 900 MHz
- Antenna: Parabolic antenna with 6 meters diameter deployed on orbit
- Energy consumption: between 500 and 1000 watts
- Polarization: hybrid (circular transmit, dual linear reception)
- Two modes: SAR mode and Sounder mode
- SAR mode: map swath width 30 km, penetration depth 6 m
- Sounder mode: vertical resolution 1 m, along-track resolution: 30 m, across-track resolution: 1,5 km

== See also ==
- Mars sample-return mission
