= Human mission to Mars =

Proposed concepts

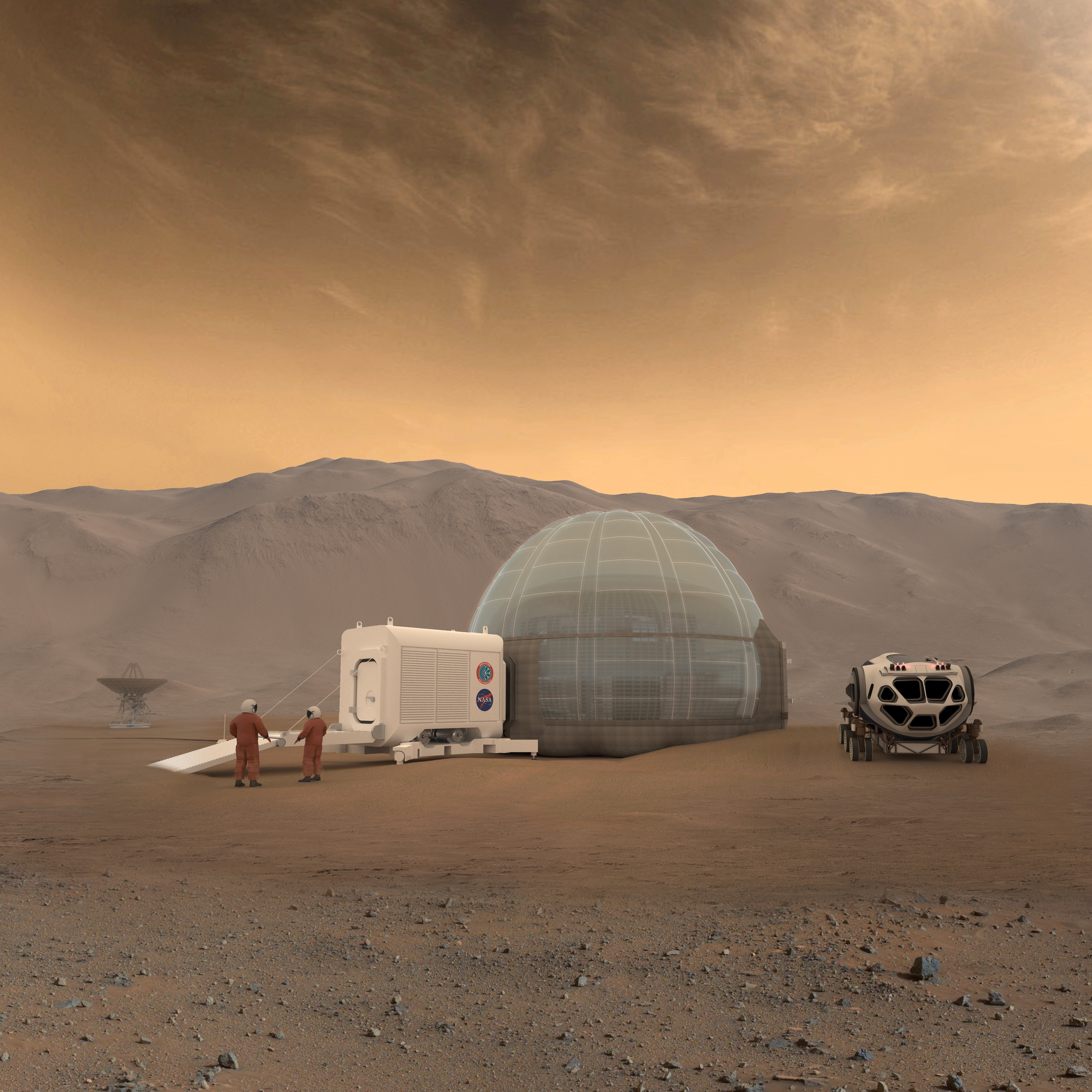
Concept for a Mars base, with ice home, pressurized rover, and Mars suits, 2016

The idea of sending humans to Mars has been the subject of aerospace engineering and scientific studies since the late 1940s as part of the broader exploration of Mars. Long-term proposals have included sending settlers and terraforming the planet. Currently, only robotic landers, rovers and a helicopter have been on Mars. As of 2026, the farthest humans have been beyond Earth is the Moon and its vicinity, with the lunar flights of the Apollo program from 1968 to 1972 and the Artemis II lunar flyby in 2026, both of which were operated by NASA.

Conceptual proposals for missions that would involve human spaceflight started in the early 1950s, with planned missions typically expected to take place between 10 and 30 years after they were drafted. The list of crewed Mars mission plans shows the proposals put forth by multiple organizations and space agencies in this field of space exploration. These plans have varied – from scientific expeditions, in which a small group (between two and eight astronauts) would visit Mars for a period of a few weeks or more, to a continuous presence (e.g. through research stations, colonization, or other continuous habitation). Some have also considered exploring the Martian moons Phobos and Deimos. By 2020, virtual visits to Mars, using haptic technology, had also been proposed.

Meanwhile, uncrewed exploration of Mars has been a goal of national space programs for decades, and was first achieved in 1965 with the Mariner 4 flyby. Human missions to Mars have been part of science fiction since the 1880s, and more broadly, in fiction, Mars is a frequent target of exploration and settlement in books, graphic novels, and films. The concept of a Martian as something living on Mars is part of the fiction. Proposals for human missions to Mars have come from agencies such as NASA, the European Space Agency, CNSA, Boeing, SpaceX, and space advocacy groups such as the Mars Society and The Planetary Society.

== Travel to Mars ==
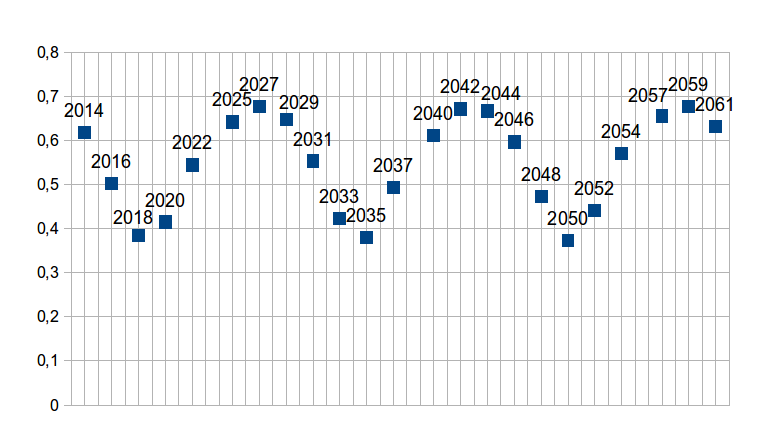
The minimum distance between the orbits of Mars and Earth from 2014 to 2061, measured in astronomical units

The energy needed for transfer between planetary orbits, or delta-v, is lowest at intervals fixed by the synodic period. For Earth–Mars trips, the period is every 26 months (2 years, 2 months), so missions are typically planned to coincide with one of these launch periods. Due to the eccentricity of Mars's orbit, the energy needed in the low-energy periods varies on roughly a 15-year cycle with the easiest periods needing only half the energy of the peaks. In the 20th century, a minimum existed in the 1969 and 1971 launch periods and another low in 1986 and 1988, then the cycle repeated. The last low-energy launch period occurred in 2023.

Several types of mission plans have been proposed, including opposition class and conjunction class, or the Crocco flyby. The lowest energy transfer to Mars is a Hohmann transfer orbit, a conjunction class mission which would involve a roughly 9-month travel time from Earth to Mars, about 500 days (16 mo) at Mars to wait for the transfer window to Earth, and a travel time of about 9 months to return to Earth. This would be a 34-month trip.

Shorter Mars mission plans have round-trip flight times of 400 to 450 days, or under 15 months for an opposition-class expedition, but would require significantly higher energy. A fast Mars mission of 245 days (8.0 months) round trip could be possible with on-orbit staging. In 2014, ballistic capture was proposed, which may reduce fuel cost and provide more flexible launch windows compared to the Hohmann.

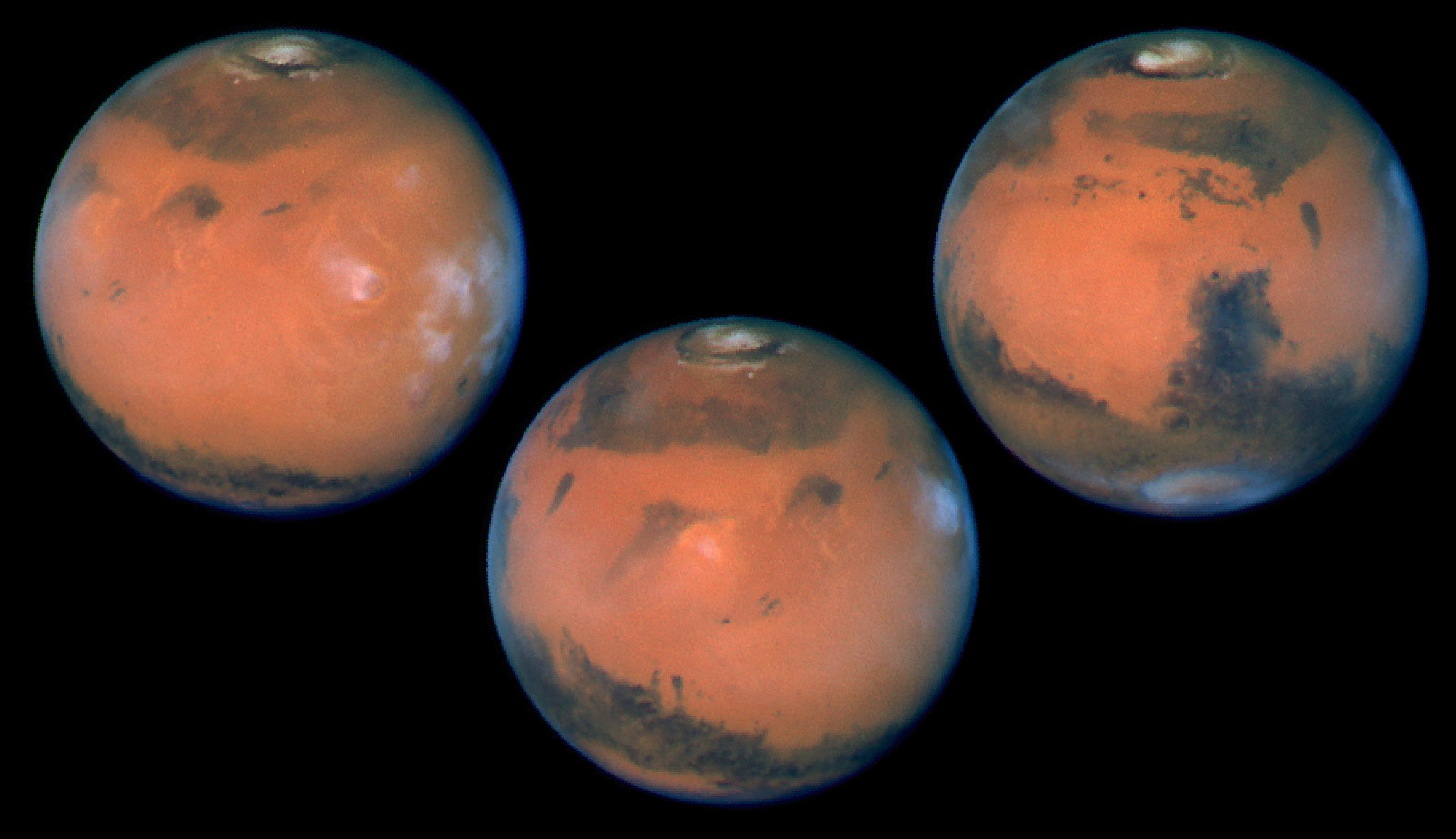
Three views of Mars, Hubble Space Telescope, 1997

In the Crocco grand tour, a crewed spacecraft would get a flyby of Mars and Venus in under a year in space. Some flyby mission architectures can also be extended to include a style of Mars landing with a flyby excursion lander spacecraft. Proposed by R. Titus in 1966, it involved a short-stay lander-ascent vehicle that would separate from a "parent" Earth-Mars transfer craft prior to its flyby of Mars. The Ascent-Descent lander would arrive sooner and either go into orbit around Mars or land, and, depending on the design, offer perhaps 10–30 days before it needed to launch itself back to the main transfer vehicle. (See also Mars flyby.)

In the 1980s, it was suggested that aerobraking at Mars could reduce the mass required for a human Mars mission lifting off from Earth by as much as half. As a result, Mars missions have designed interplanetary spacecraft and landers capable of aerobraking.

== Landing on Mars ==
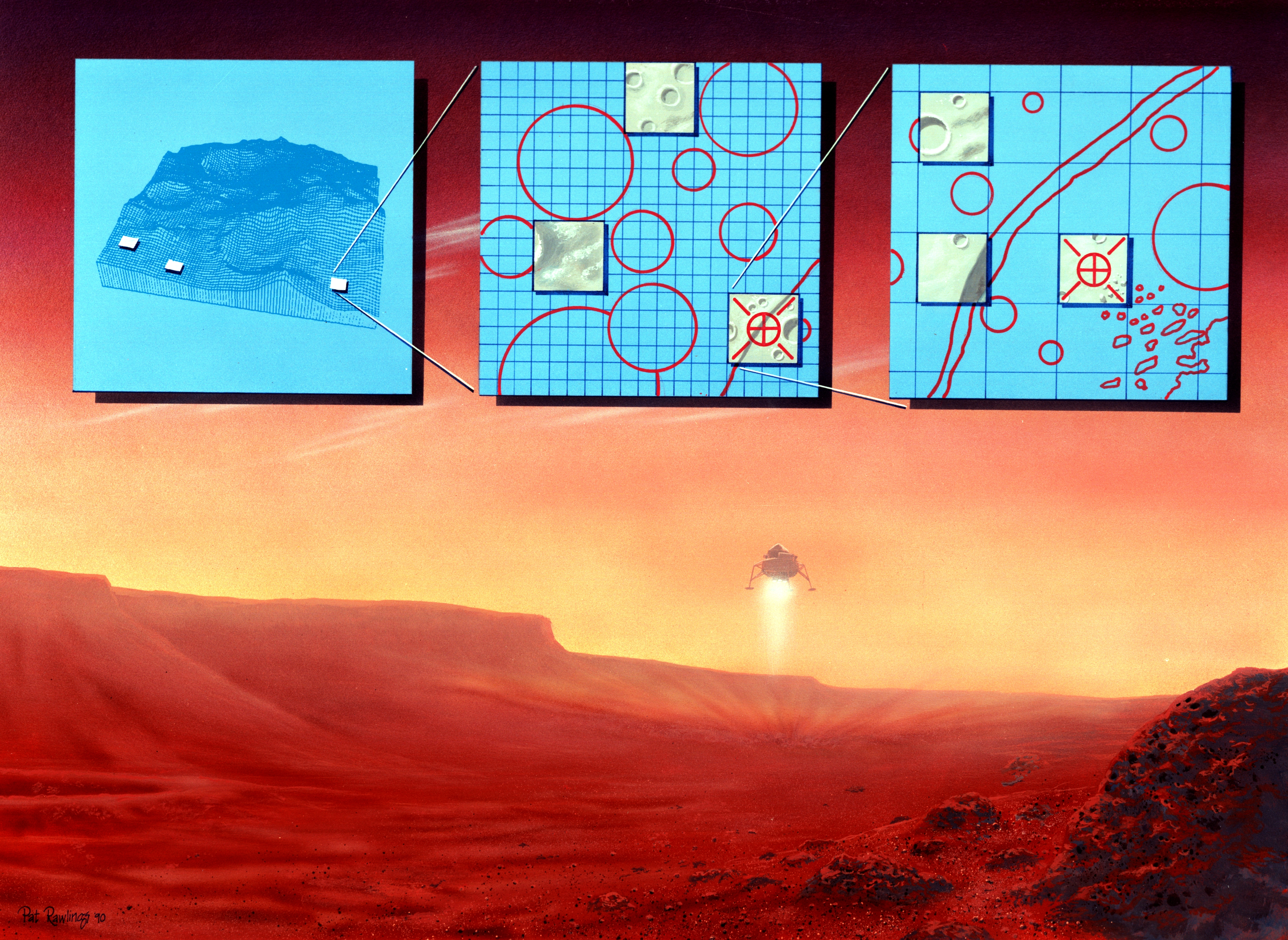
Inserts depict observation and analysis to find a safe landing site.

A number of uncrewed spacecraft have landed on the surface of Mars, while some, such as Beagle2 (2003) and the Schiaparelli EDM (2016), have failed what is considered a difficult landing. Among the successes:

- Mars 3 – 1971
- Viking 1 and Viking 2 – 1976
- Mars Pathfinder and its Sojourner rover – 1997
- Spirit and Opportunity rovers – 2004
- Phoenix lander – 2008
- Curiosity rover – 2012
- InSight lander – 2018
- Tianwen-1 lander and Zhurong rover – 2021
- Perseverance rover and Ingenuity helicopter – 2021

=== Orbital capture ===
When an expedition reaches Mars, braking is required to enter orbit. Two options are available: rockets or aerocapture. Aerocapture at Mars for human missions was studied in the 20th century. In a review of 93 Mars studies, 24 used aerocapture for Mars or Earth return. One of the considerations for using aerocapture on crewed missions is a limit on the maximum force experienced by the astronauts. The current scientific consensus is that 5 g, or five times Earth's gravity, is the maximum allowable deceleration.

=== Survey work ===
Conducting a safe landing requires knowledge of the properties of the atmosphere, first observed by Mariner 4, and a survey of the planet to identify suitable landing sites. Major global surveys were conducted by Mariner 9, Viking 1, and two orbiters, which supported the Viking landers. Later orbiters, such as Mars Global Surveyor, 2001 Mars Odyssey, Mars Express, and Mars Reconnaissance Orbiter, have mapped Mars in higher resolution with improved instruments. These later surveys have identified the probable locations of water, a critical resource.

=== Funding ===
Sending humans to Mars will be expensive. In 2010, one estimate was roughly US$500 billion, but the actual costs will likely be more. Starting in the late 1950s, the early phase of space exploration was conducted as a space race by lone nations, as much to make a political statement as to study the Solar System. This proved to be unsustainable, and the current climate is one of international cooperation, with large projects such as the International Space Station being built and launched by multiple countries.

Critics argue that the immense cost outweighs the immediate benefits of establishing a human presence on Mars and that funds could be better redirected toward other programs, such as robotic exploration. Proponents of human space exploration contend that the symbolism of establishing a presence in space may garner public interest to join the cause and spark global cooperation. There are also claims that a long-term investment in space travel is necessary for humanity's survival.

One factor to reduce the cost of sending humans to Mars may be space tourism. Growth in that business and technological developments would bring economies of scale and thus a lower cost of human spaceflight. A similar concept can be examined in the history of personal computers: when computers were used only for scientific research, with minor use in big industry, they were big, rare, heavy, and costly. When the potential market increased, and they started to become common in businesses and later in homes (in Western and developed countries), the computing power of home devices skyrocketed, and prices plummeted.

=== Medical ===
Comparison of radiation doses – includes the amount detected on a trip from Earth to Mars by the RAD inside the MSL (2011–2013). Vertical axis is in logarithmic scale, so the dose over a Mars year is about 15 times the U.S. Department of Energy limit, not less than twice, as a quick glance might suggest. The actual dose would depend on factors such as spacecraft design and natural events such as solar flares.

Several key physical challenges exist for human missions to Mars:

- Health threat from cosmic rays and other ionizing radiation. In May 2013, NASA scientists reported that a possible mission to Mars may involve great radiation risk based on energetic particle radiation measured by the radiation assessment detector (RAD) on the Mars Science Laboratory while traveling from the Earth to Mars in 2011–2012. The calculated radiation dose was 0.66 sieverts round-trip. The agency's career radiation limit for astronauts is 1 sievert. In mid-September 2017, NASA reported temporarily doubled radiation levels on the surface of Mars, with an aurora 25 times brighter than any observed earlier, due to a massive unexpected solar storm.

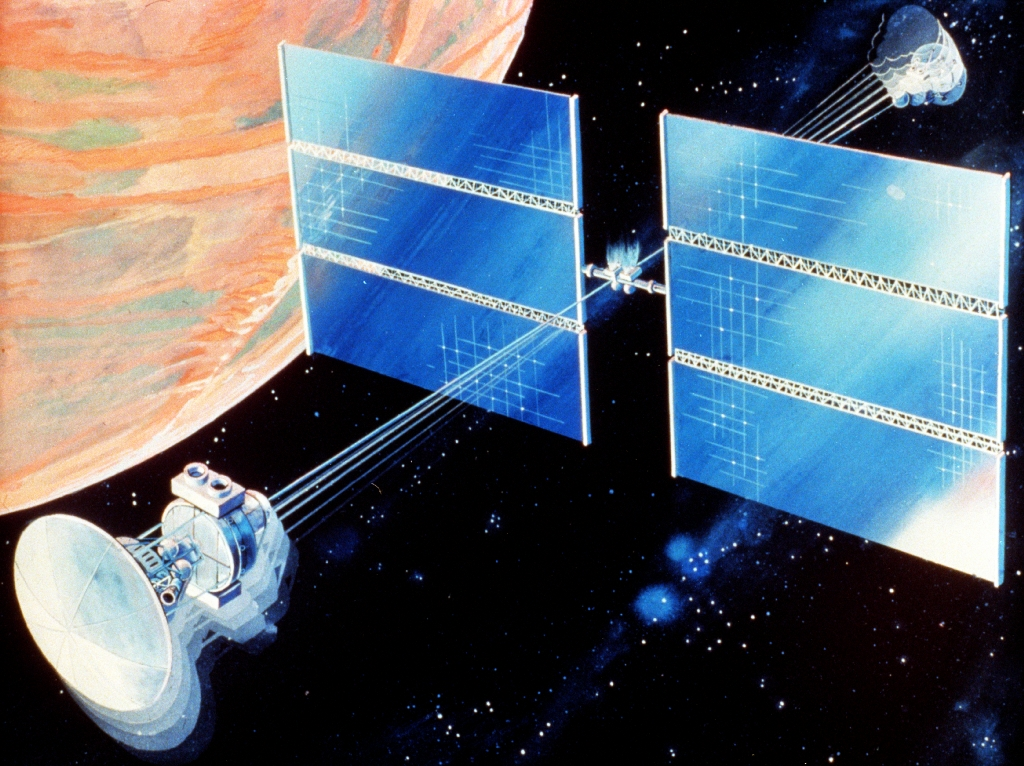
Artistic vision of spacecraft providing artificial gravity by spinning (see also Centrifugal force)

- Loss of kidney function. On 11 June 2024, researchers at the University College of London's Department of Renal Medicine reported that "Serious health risks emerge (with respect to the kidneys) the longer a person is exposed to (the Galactic Radiation and Microgravity that astronauts would be exposed to during a Mars mission)."
- Adverse health effects of prolonged weightlessness, including bone mineral density loss and eyesight impairment. (Depends on mission and spacecraft design.) In November 2019, researchers reported that astronauts experienced serious blood flow and clotting problems while on board the International Space Station, based on a six-month study of 11 healthy astronauts. The results may influence long-term spaceflight, including a mission to the planet Mars, according to the researchers.
- Psychological and sociological effects of spaceflight involving long isolation from Earth and the lack of community due to lack of a real-time connection with Earth (compare Hermit).
- Social effects of several humans living under cramped conditions for more than one Earth year (possibly two or three years, depending on spacecraft and mission design).
- Lack of medical facilities.
- Potential failure of propulsion or life-support equipment.

Some of these issues were estimated statistically in the HUMEX study. Ehlmann and others have reviewed political and economic concerns, as well as technological and biological feasibility aspects. While fuel for roundtrip travel could be a challenge, methane and oxygen can be produced using Martian H_{2}O (preferably as water ice instead of liquid water) and atmospheric CO_{2} with sufficiently mature technology.

=== Planetary protection ===
Robotic spacecraft that travel to Mars require sterilization. The allowable limit is 300,000 spores on the exterior of general craft, with stricter requirements for spacecraft bound for "special regions" containing water. Otherwise there is a risk of contaminating not only the life-detection experiments but possibly the planet itself.

Sterilizing human missions to this level is impossible, as humans are typically host to a hundred trillion (10^{14}) microorganisms of thousands of species of the human microbiota, and these cannot be removed. Containment seems the only option, but it is a major challenge in the event of a hard landing (i.e., a crash). There have been several planetary workshops on this issue, yet there are no final guidelines for a way forward. Human explorers would also be vulnerable to back contamination to Earth if they become carriers of microorganisms.

== Mission proposal ==
Over the past seven decades, a wide variety of mission architectures have been proposed or studied for human spaceflights to Mars. These have included chemical, nuclear, and electric propulsion, as well as a wide variety of landing, living, and return methodologies.

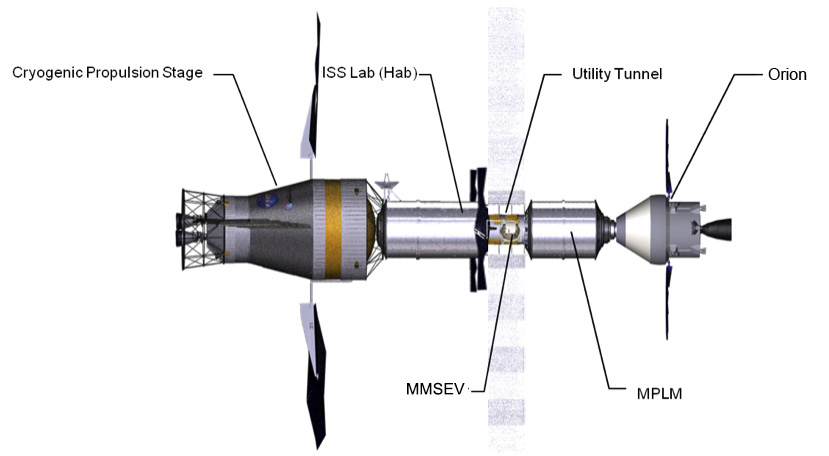
Artist's rendering of the planned Orion/DSH/Cryogenic Propulsion Module assembly

A number of nations and organizations have long-term intentions to send humans to Mars.

- The United States has several robotic missions currently exploring Mars, with a sample-return planned for the future. The Orion Multi-Purpose Crew Vehicle (MPCV) is intended to serve as the launch/splashdown crew delivery vehicle, with a Deep Space Habitat module providing additional living space for the 16-month-long journey. The first crewed Mars Mission, which would include sending astronauts to Mars, orbiting Mars, and returning to Earth, is proposed for the 2030s. Technology development for US government missions to Mars is underway, but there is no well-funded approach to bring the conceptual project to completion with human landings on Mars by the mid-2030s, the stated objective. NASA-funded engineers are studying a way to build potential human habitats there by producing bricks from pressurized Martian soil.
- The ESA has a long-term goal to send humans but has not built a crewed spacecraft as of October 2024. It sent robotic probes, such as ExoMars, in 2016 and planned to send the next probe in 2022, but the project was suspended due to Russia's invasion of Ukraine. As of November 2022, it was looking to send the probe in 2028 with assistance from NASA.

== Technological innovations and hurdles ==
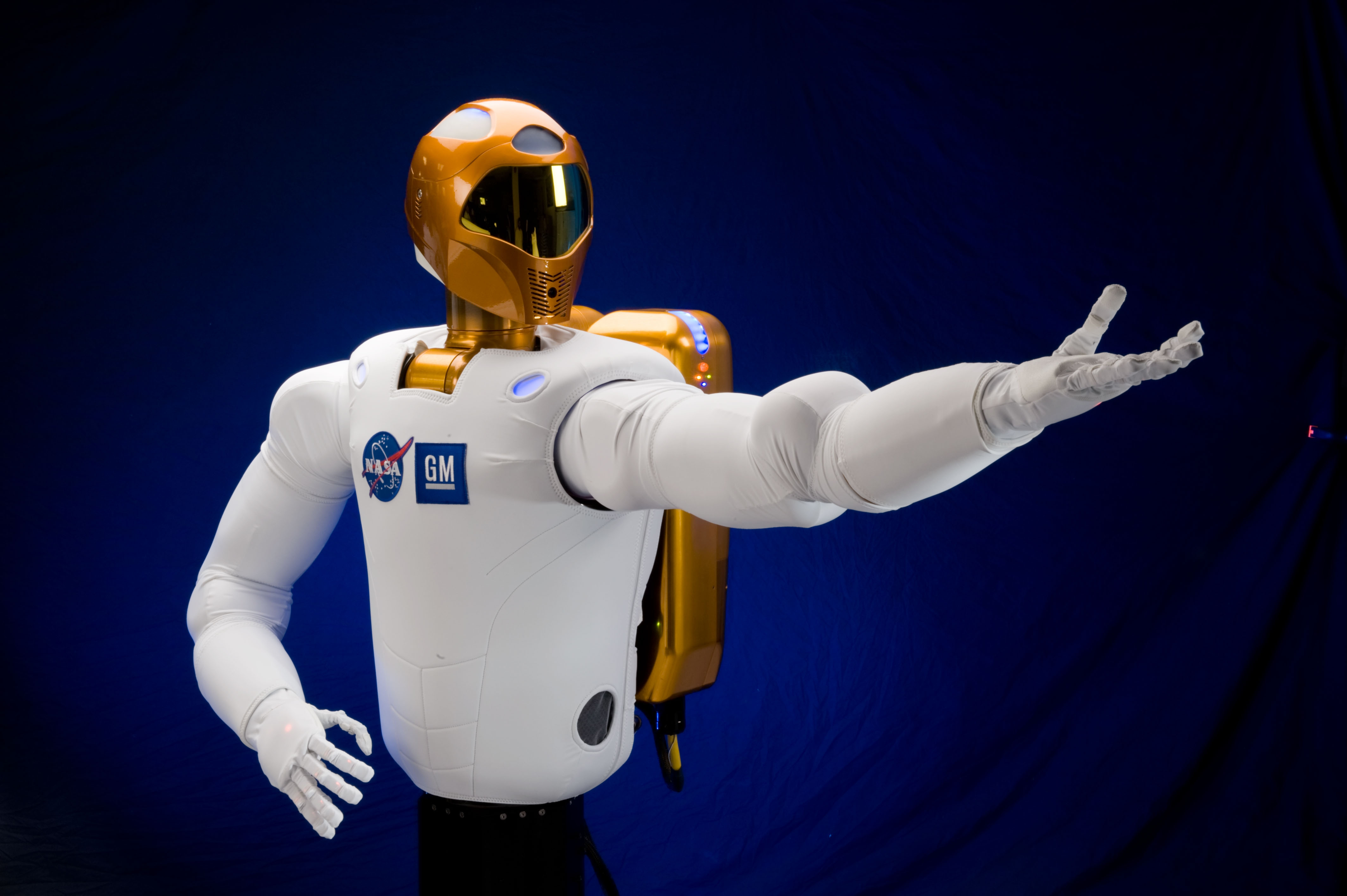
NASA has stated that robots will prepare an underground base for a human surface mission.

Significant technological hurdles need to be overcome for human spaceflight to Mars.

Entry into the thin and shallow Martian atmosphere will pose significant difficulties with re-entry; compared to Earth's much denser atmosphere, any spacecraft will descend very rapidly to the surface and must be slowed. A heat shield has to be used. NASA is carrying out research on retro-propulsive deceleration technologies to develop new approaches to Mars atmospheric entry. A key problem with propulsive techniques is handling the fluid flow problems and attitude control of the descent vehicle during the supersonic retropropulsion phase of the entry and deceleration.

A return mission from Mars will need to land a rocket to carry crew off the surface. Launch requirements mean that this rocket could be significantly smaller than an Earth-to-orbit rocket. A Mars-to-orbit launch can also be achieved in a single stage. Despite this, landing an ascent rocket back on Mars will be difficult.

In 2014, NASA proposed the Mars Ecopoiesis Test Bed.

Intravenous fluid

One of the medical supplies that might be needed is a considerable mass of intravenous fluid, which is mainly water, but contains other substances so it can be added directly to the human blood stream. If it could be created on the spot from existing water, this would reduce mass requirements. A prototype for this capability was tested on the International Space Station in 2010.

Advanced resistive exercise device

A person who is inactive for an extended period of time loses strength, muscle and bone mass. Spaceflight conditions are known to cause loss of bone mineral density in astronauts, increasing bone fracture risk. The most recent mathematical models predict 33% of astronauts will be at risk for osteoporosis during a human mission to Mars. A resistive exercise device similar to an Advanced Resistive Exercise Device (ARED) would be needed in the spaceship but would not fully counteract the loss of bone mineral density.

Breathing gases

While humans can breathe pure oxygen, usually additional gases such as nitrogen are included in the breathing mix. One possibility is to use in situ nitrogen and argon from the atmosphere of Mars, but they are hard to separate from each other. As a result, a Mars habitat may use 40% argon, 40% nitrogen, and 20% oxygen.

An idea for keeping carbon dioxide out of the breathing air is to use reusable amine-bead carbon dioxide scrubbers. While one carbon dioxide scrubber filters the astronaut's air, the other is vented to the Mars atmosphere.

Growing food

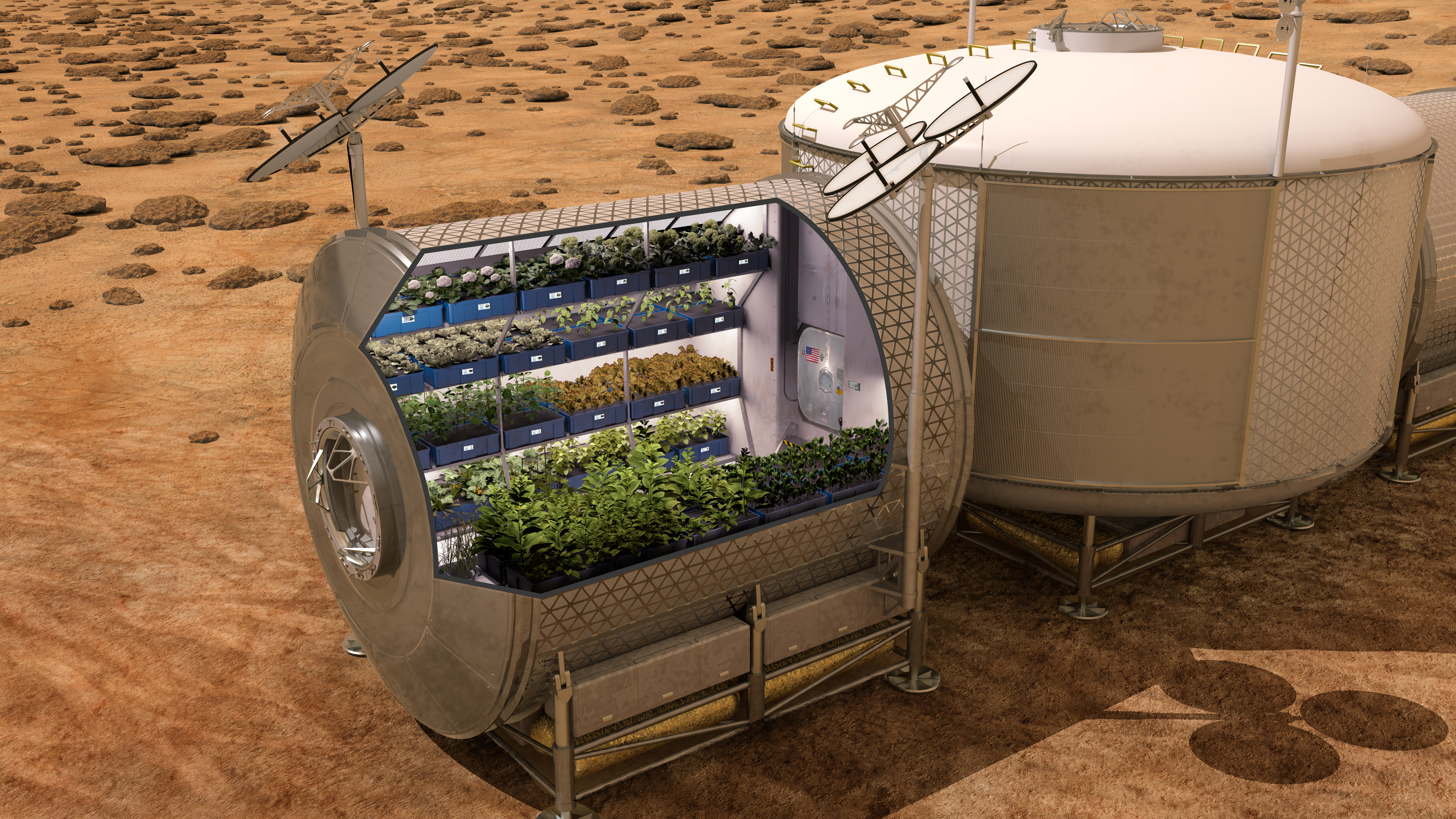
Depiction of plants growing in a Mars base. NASA plans to grow plants for space food.

If humans are to live on Mars, growing food on Mars may be necessary – with numerous related challenges. Making soil useful for growing plants using existing Mars regolith is made more difficult by the lack of any organic material in the regolith and by the existence of about 0.5% perchlorates, a toxic salt that would damage the thyroid, kidneys and human cells in general. The environment is also too cold and lacks water except possibly at the poles.

In 2022, NASA co-funded a multi-year grant of US$1.9 million awarded to Arizona State University, the University of Arizona, and the Florida Institute of Technology to explore the idea of using Dehalococcoides mccartyi bacteria, among other microbes, to reduce the perchlorate content and add organic material to simulated Mars regolith. D. mccartyi also break down the perchlorates into harmless chloride and useful oxygen along with leaving organics in the soil as excretions and when they die, thus potentially solving several problems at one time.

== Related missions ==
Some missions may be considered a "Mission to Mars" in their own right, or they may only be one step in a more in-depth program. Examples include planetary flyby missions, missions to Mars's moons, and study of the effects of the Martian environment on spacesuit materials by the Perseverance rover.

=== Missions to Deimos or Phobos ===
Many Mars mission concepts propose precursor missions to the moons of Mars, for example a sample return mission to the Mars moon Phobos – not quite Mars, but perhaps a convenient stepping stone to an eventual Martian surface mission. Lockheed Martin, as part of their "Stepping stones to Mars" project, called the "Red Rocks Project", proposed to explore Mars robotically from Deimos.

Use of fuel produced from water resources on Phobos or Deimos has also been proposed.

=== Uncrewed Mars sample return missions ===
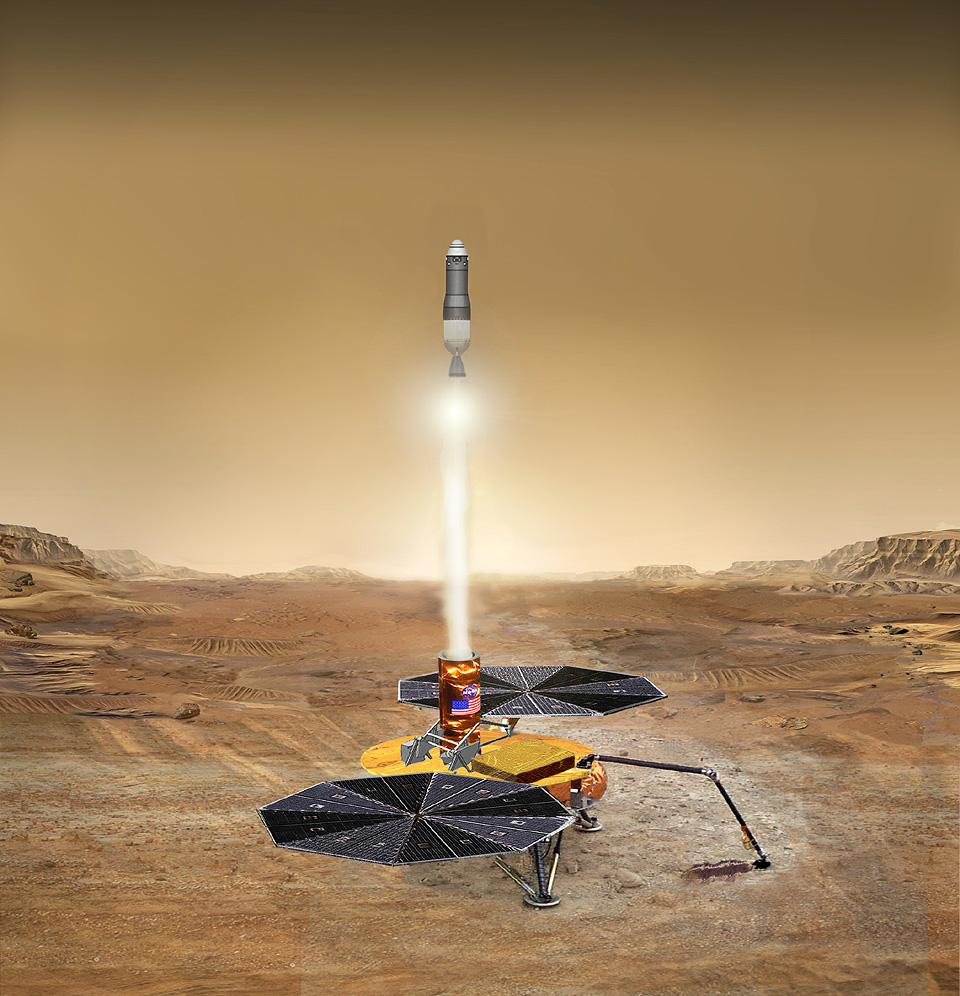
Sample return mission concept

An uncrewed Mars sample return mission (MSR) has sometimes been considered as a precursor to crewed missions to the Mars surface. In 2008, the ESA called a sample return "essential" and said it could bridge the gap between robotic and human missions to Mars. An example of a Mars sample return mission is Sample Collection for Investigation of Mars. Mars sample return was the highest priority Flagship Mission proposed for NASA by the Planetary Decadal Survey 2013–2022: The Future of Planetary Science. However, such missions have been hampered by complexity and expense, with one ESA proposal involving no fewer than five different uncrewed spacecraft.

Sample return plans raise the concern, however remote, that an infectious agent could be brought to Earth. Regardless, a basic set of guidelines for extraterrestrial sample return has been laid out depending on the source of sample (e.g. asteroid, Moon, Mars surface, etc.).

At the dawn of the 21st century, NASA crafted four potential pathways to Mars human missions, of which three included a Mars sample return as a prerequisite to human landing.

The rover Perseverance, which landed on Mars in 2021, is equipped with a device that allows it to collect rock samples to be returned at a later date by another mission. Perseverance, as part of the Mars 2020 mission, was launched on an Atlas V rocket on 30 July 2020.

=== Crewed orbital missions ===
Starting in 2004, NASA scientists have proposed to explore Mars via telepresence from human astronauts in orbit.

A similar idea was the proposed "Human Exploration using Real-time Robotic Operations" mission.

In order to reduce communications latency, which ranges from 4 to 24 minutes, a crewed Mars orbital station has been proposed to control robots and Mars aircraft without long latency.

== See also ==
- Delta-v budget – Estimate of total change in velocity of a space mission
- Life on Mars – Assessments of possible life on Mars
- List of missions to Mars
- Mars analog habitat – Research simulating the environment on Mars
- Mars Desert Research Station – Longest-running Mars analog habitat
- Mars Design Reference Mission – Conceptual design studies for crewed missions to Mars
- Mars Society – Advocacy group for Mars exploration
- Space weather – Branch of space physics and aeronomy
- SpaceX Mars colonization program – Proposed human Mars program by SpaceX
