= Mars-Grunt =

Proposed Russian Mars sample-return mission

- Names: Expedition-M
- Mission type: Single launch: orbiter, lander, ascent vehicle, sample-return
- Operator: Russian Federal Space Agency

Spacecraft properties
- Bus: Pereletny Modul or Flagman
- Manufacturer: NPO Lavochkin; Russian Space Research Institute
- Launch mass: 4,100 kg
- Landing mass: 2,750 kg, including Mars Ascent Vehicle (450 kg)
- Dry mass: Orbiter: 450 kg (990 lb)
- Power: solar array

Start of mission
- Launch date: 2030s (proposed)
- Rocket: Angara A5 / KTVK
- Launch site: Vostochny Site 1A
- Contractor: Roscosmos

Mars orbiter

Orbital parameters
- Peri altitude: 500 km (310 mi)
- Apo altitude: 500 km (310 mi)

Mars lander
- Sample mass: ≈0.2 kg (0.44 lb)

Mars-Grunt, also known as Expedition-M (Russian: Марс-Грунт), is a proposed robotic Mars sample-return mission. It was proposed to the Russian Federal Space Agency (Roscosmos) by the Russian Space Research Institute.

As of September 2023, Mars-Grunt is expected to be sent to Mars following the success of Boomerang (Fobos-Grunt-2), which in turn is expected sometime after 2030.

== Lander ==
If funded by the Russian space agency Roscosmos, it would be developed by the Russian Space Research Institute and NPO Lavochkin, based on Fobos-Grunt technology. Designs show a dome-shaped lander would separate from the orbiter and would enter the Martian atmosphere protected within an inflatable rubber braking cone and fire retrorockets for a soft landing. Once a robotic arm selects and retrieves the samples (mass about 0.2 kilograms (0.44 lb)), a small rocket in the top of the lander would blast the ascent vehicle for rendezvous and docking with the orbiter for the soil sample transfer into the return vehicle.

== Cruise stage ==
The cruise stage PM (from Pereletny Modul Russian: Перелётный Модуль) is sometimes referred to as Flagman (not to be confused with a proposal combining the Blok D and Fregat stages, known by the same name), and closely resembles the Fregat-M stage. It was developed for the Fobos-Grunt mission, but its basic architecture is promised to be the base for a whole generation of future planetary missions, including Luna-Glob, Luna-Resurs and Luna-Grunt to the Moon; Venera-D to Venus; Mars-NET and Mars-Grunt to Mars and, possibly, Sokol-Laplas to Jupiter. The platform's developer - NPO Lavochkin - stressed that in different configuration, the same bus could be adapted as an orbiter or as a lander.

== Status ==
If the technology being developed for Luna Glob to the Moon, and Fobos-Grunt-2 to Mars' moon Phobos, is proved successful, it will then be used on Mars-Grunt.

== Tasks ==
Tasks set by the NPO Lavochkin and Roscosmos:

- Delivery of substance samples from Mars to Earth
- Refinement of engineering and technical models of the atmosphere and surface of Mars
- Detailed geochemical analysis of soil substance on Mars
- Study of the interaction processes between the atmosphere, solar radiation, and the surface of Mars

== See also ==
- Phobos program
