= Sample Collection for Investigation of Mars =

Concept for a Mars air and dust sample return

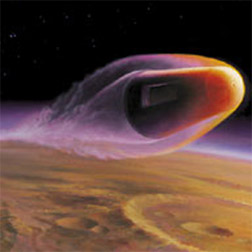
Artist concept of SCIM passing through the Martian atmosphere

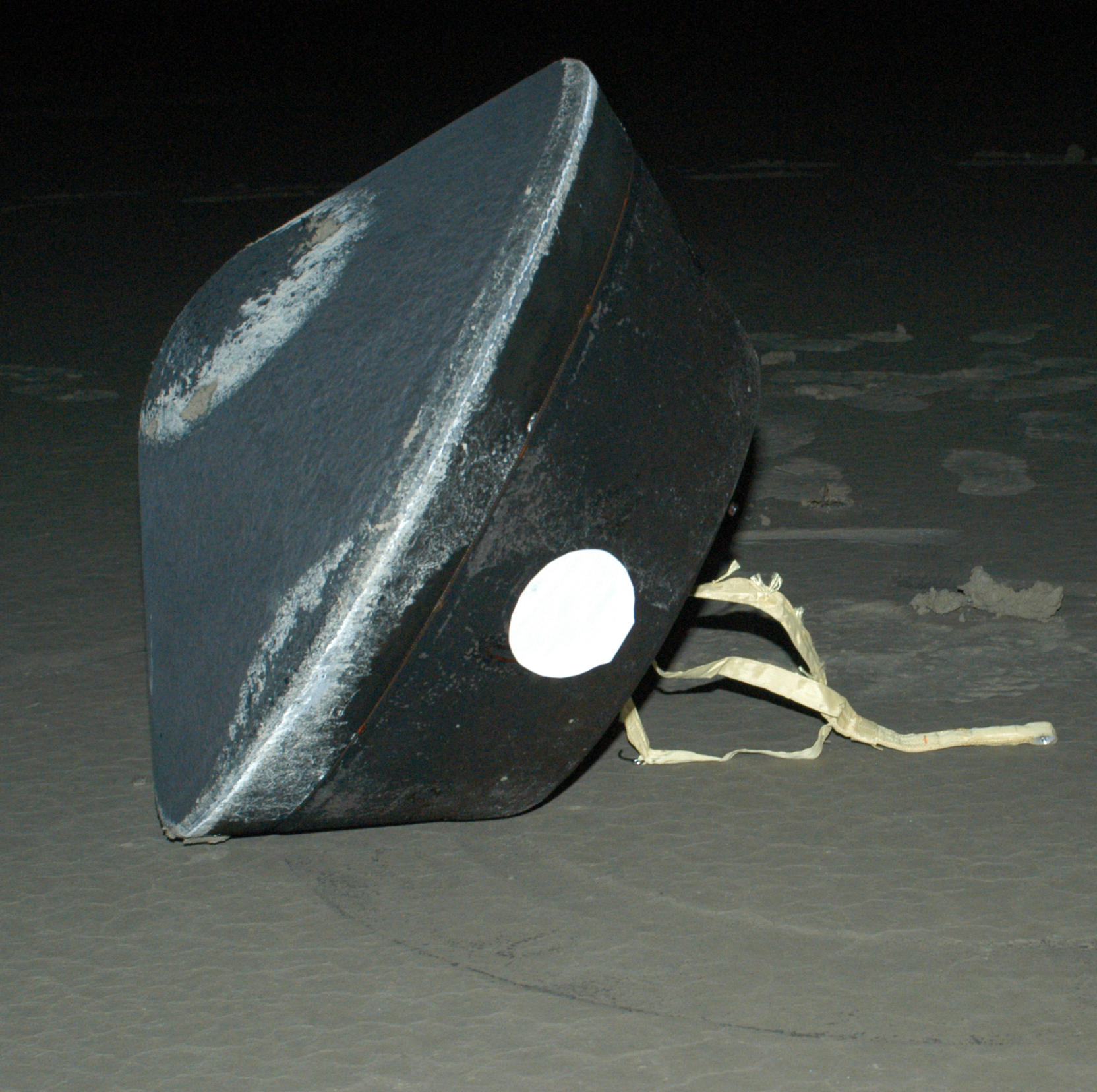
Stardust's returned landing capsule upon discovery after a successful entry and Earth landing in 2006. This mission was noted as aiding the SCIM concept.

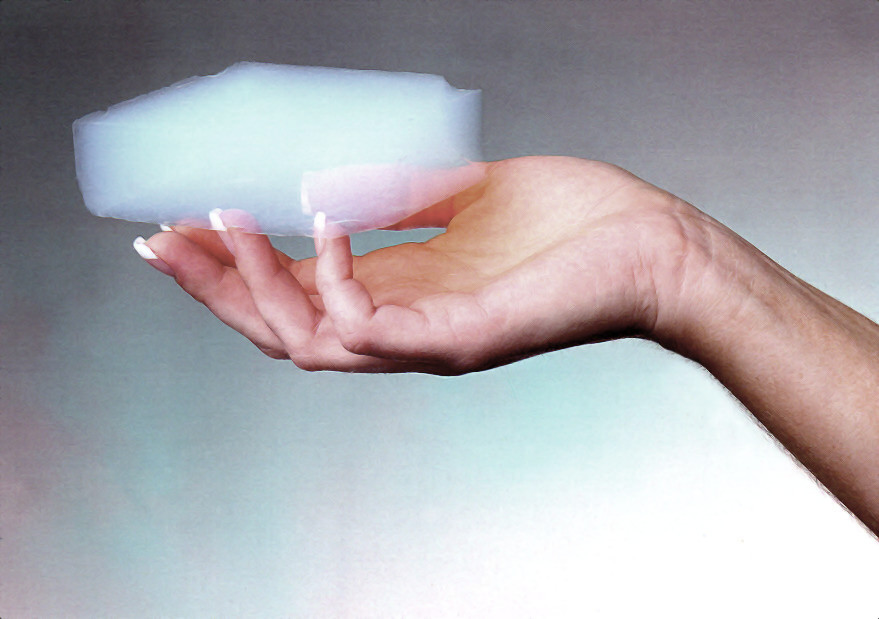
A block of aerogel in a person's hand

The Sample Collection for Investigation of Mars (SCIM) is a mission concept for a Mars air and dust sample return. It was a semi-finalist at the Mars Scout Program along with four other missions in December 2002. The SCIM mission would be designed to skim through the Mars atmosphere without landing or entering orbit. It would collect samples in an aerogel and take them back to Earth on a free-return trajectory.

The success of fellow Discovery program mission Stardust was noted as supporting future sample return missions, and in particular supporting the SCIM concept. This Stardust mission was similar in that it returned extraterrestrial material to Earth with an unmanned robotic spacecraft.

== Overview ==
SCIM would collect air and dust samples by flying through the atmosphere of Mars without landing or orbiting. The design utilizes heritage from the successful Stardust and Genesis sample return missions. A pass through the atmosphere about 40 km (25 mi) above Mars' surface at a speed of 6 km/s would result in millions of particles being encountered. The particles would be collected in an aerogel and returned to Earth inside a small sealed capsule. Analysis of the dust could confirm the origin of the suspected meteorites on Earth from Mars.

SCIM was studied in 2002 for the 2007 Mars Scout Program mission as a relatively low-cost, low-risk Mars sample return. It achieved semifinalist status. The other semifinalist missions were ARES, Phoenix, and MARVEL (Mars Volcanic Emission and Life Scout). ARES was a powered Mars aircraft, Phoenix was a polar lander, and MARVEL was an orbiter.

== Private funding proposal ==
In 2014 the BoldlyGo organization stated their intention of raising money for this mission privately. They stated that many space missions are not being flown due lack of funds, not because there are issues with the proposals.

== See also ==
- Mars sample return mission
- InSights
