= Mars sample-return mission =

Mars mission to collect rock and dust samples

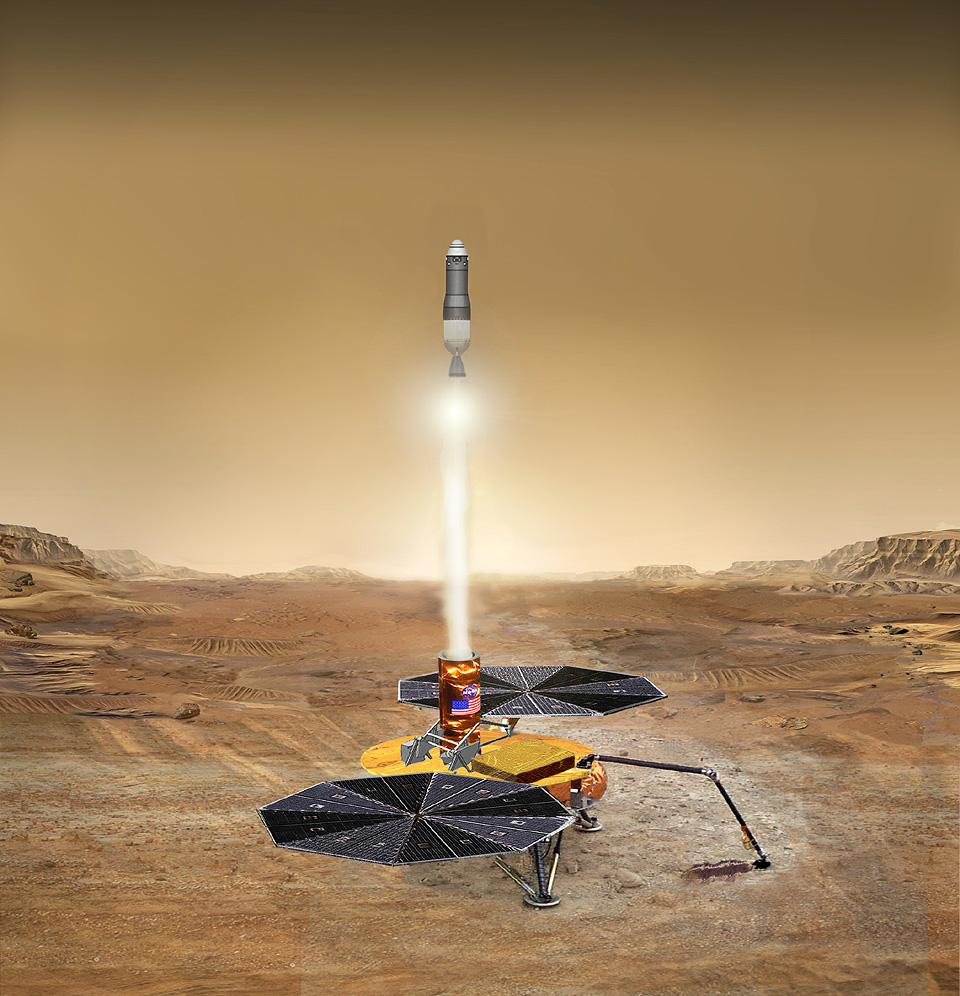
Mars sample return – artist's concept

A Mars sample-return (MSR) mission is a proposed mission to collect rock and dust samples on Mars and return them to Earth. Such a mission would allow more extensive analysis than that allowed by onboard sensors, focused on whether Mars once hosted life. Back contamination of Earth's biosphere from returned Martian samples has been raised but this risk is considered to be low.

As of 2026, China National Space Administration's robotic dual-launch Tianwen-3 mission is planned for the December 2028–January 2029 Mars launch window. Roscosmos plans to launch Mars-Grunt in the 2030s. The Martian Moons eXploration (MMX) by JAXA, launched in October 2026, is aimed at returning samples from Phobos. The NASA-ESA Mars Sample Return was cancelled by the US in 2026.

== Scientific value ==
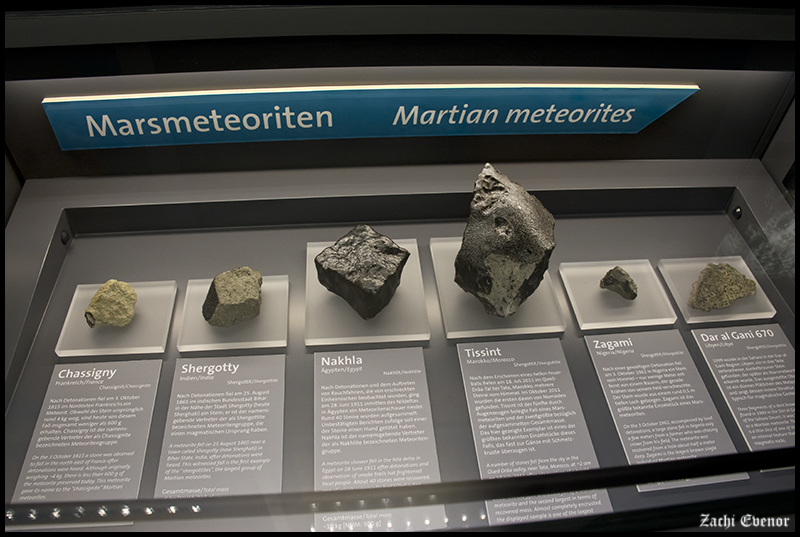
Mars meteorites in the Natural History Museum in Vienna

Once returned to Earth, stored samples can be studied with the most sophisticated science instruments available. Thomas Zurbuchen, associate administrator for science at NASA Headquarters in Washington D.C., expects such studies to allow several new discoveries at many fields. Samples may be reanalyzed in the future by instruments that do not yet exist.

In 2006, the Mars Exploration Program Analysis Group identified 55 important investigations related to Mars exploration. In 2008, they concluded that about half of the investigations "could be addressed to one degree or another by MSR", making MSR "the single mission that would make the most progress towards the entire list" of investigations. Moreover, it was reported that a significant fraction of the investigations could not be meaningfully advanced without returned samples.

One source of Mars samples is what are thought to be Martian meteorites, which are rocks ejected from Mars that made their way to Earth. As of August 2023, 356 meteorites had been identified as Martian, out of over 79,000 known meteorites. These meteorites are believed to be from Mars because their elemental and isotopic compositions are similar to rocks and atmospheric gases analyzed on Mars.

== History ==
=== Before 1990 ===
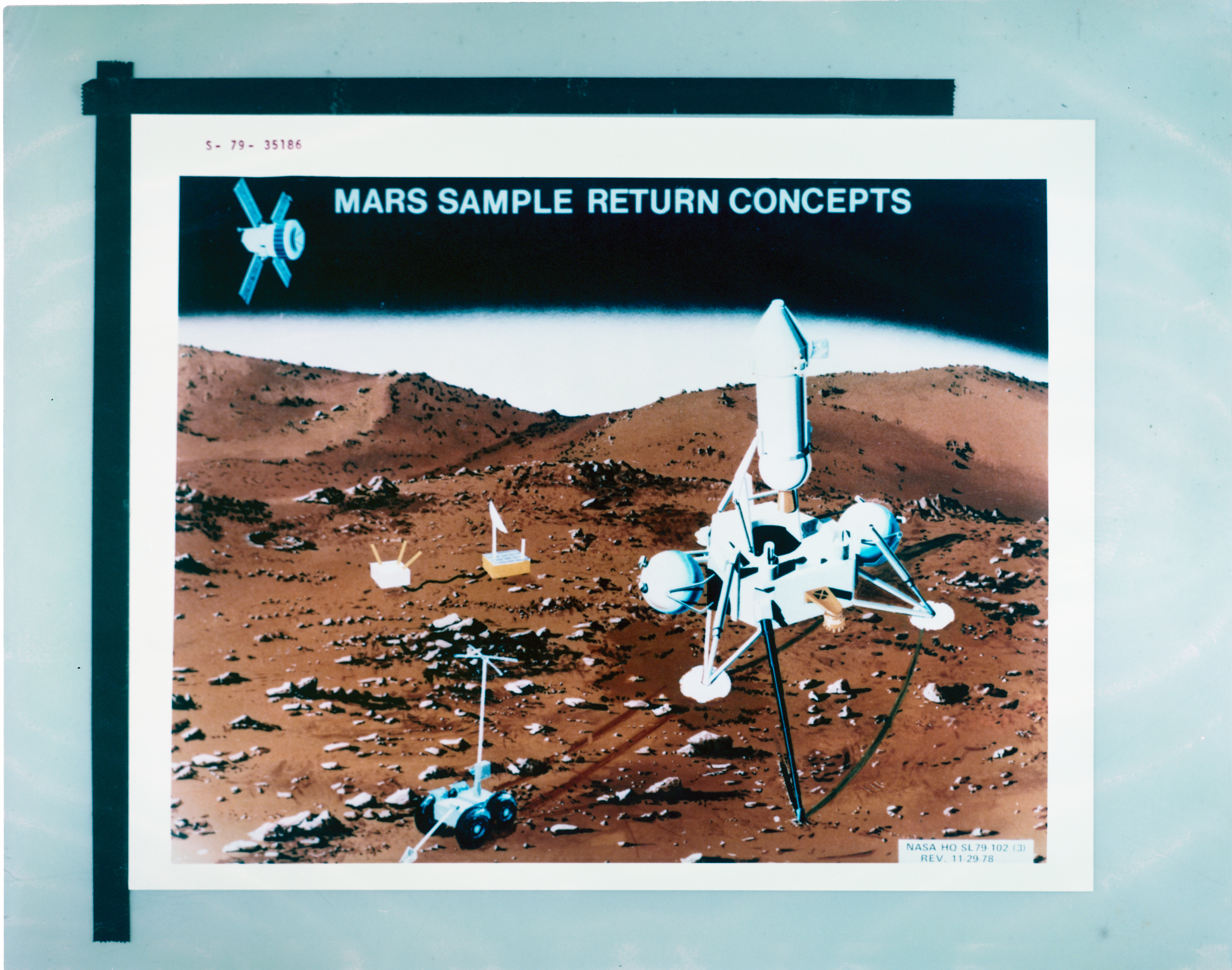
Artist concept of a Mars sample-return mission, 1979

Returning from Mars appeared in technical literature when Apollo was still in development and the first spacecraft to fly past Mars had not yet launched, with an expectation that people would be on board for Mars ascent. The density of the Mars atmosphere remained unknown at that time, so the Lockheed engineering author reported the analysis of trajectory options over a range of aerodynamic drag conditions for a 15-ton launch vehicle to reach a rendezvous orbit.

At NASA, returning samples from Mars was studied jointly by the Langley Research Center and the Jet Propulsion Laboratory in the early 1970s during the time that the Viking Mars lander mission was in development, and a Langley author noted that the "Mars surface-to-orbit launch vehicle" would need high performance because its mass would "have a substantial impact on the mass and systems requirements" for earlier mission phases, delivery of that vehicle to Mars and launch preparations on Mars.

For at least three decades, scientists have advocated the return of geological samples from Mars. One early concept was the Sample Collection for Investigation of Mars (SCIM) proposal, which involved sending a spacecraft in a grazing pass through Mars's upper atmosphere to collect dust and air samples without landing or orbiting.

The Soviet Union considered a Mars sample-return mission, Mars 5NM, in 1975 but it was cancelled due to the repeated failures of the N1 rocket that would have launched it. Another sample-return mission, Mars 5M (Mars-79), planned for 1979, was cancelled due to complexity and technical problems.

In the mid-1980's, JPL mission planners noted that MSR had been "pushed by budgetary and other pressures into the '90s," and that the round trip would "impose large propulsion requirements." They presented a notional mass budget for a concept that would launch a 9.5-metric-ton payload from Earth, including a Mars orbiter for Earth return, and a lander having a 400-kg rover and a "Mars return vehicle" that would mass over 2 metric tons. A 20-kg sample canister would arrive at Earth containing 5 kg of samples including scientific-quality cores drilled from every type of Mars terrain.

In the late 1980s, multiple NASA centers contributed to a proposed Mars Rover Sample Return mission (MRSR). As described by JPL authors, one option for MRSR relied on a single launch of a 12-ton package including a Mars orbiter and Earth return vehicle, a 700-kg rover, and a 2.7-ton Mars ascent vehicle (MAV) which would use pump-fed liquid propulsion for a significant mass saving. A 20-kg sample package on the MAV was to contain 5 kg of Mars soil. A Johnson Space Center author subsequently referred to a launch from Earth in 1998 with a MAV mass in the range 1400 to 1500 kg including a pump-fed first stage and a pressure-fed second stage.

=== 1990 onward ===
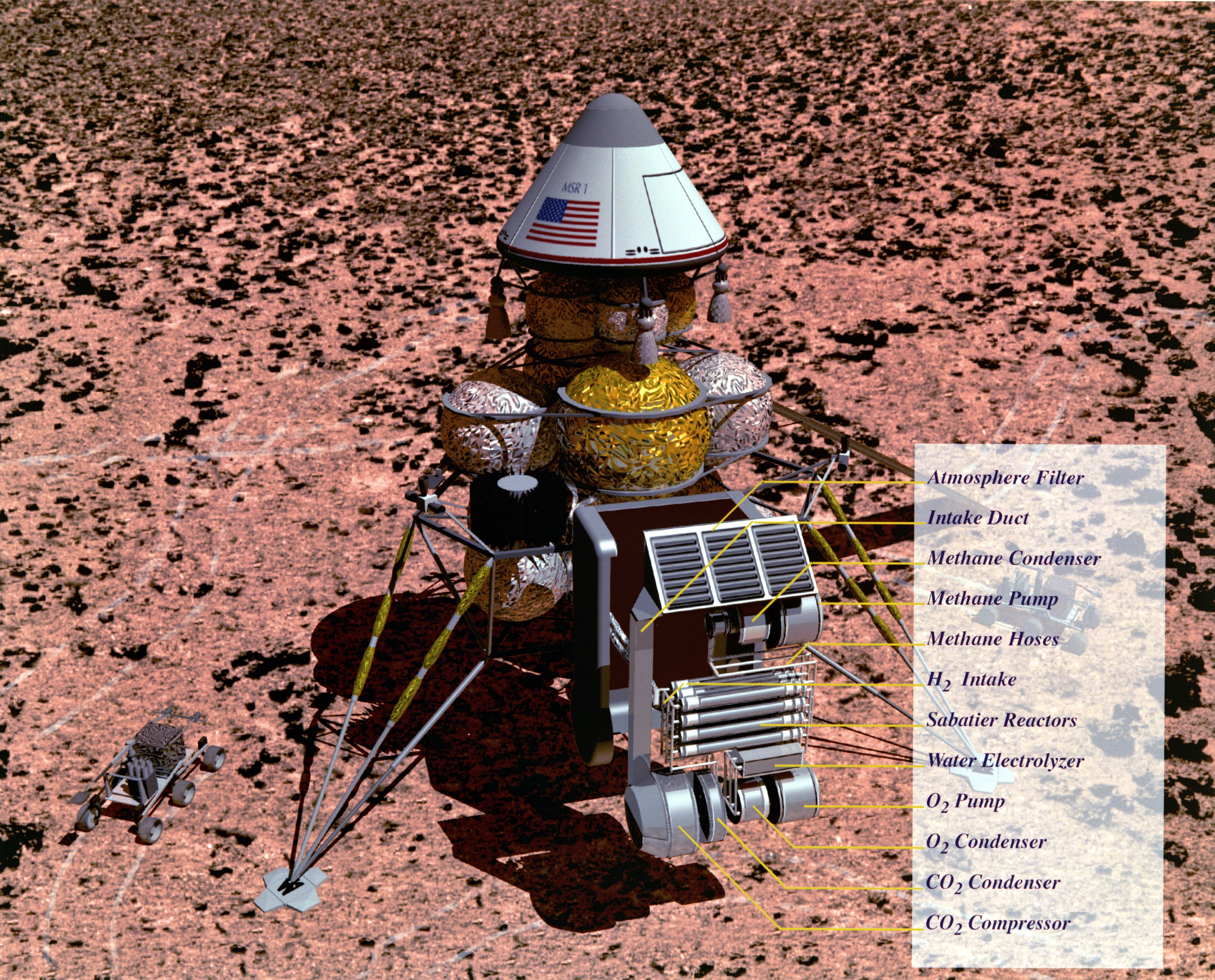
Artist concept of a Mars sample-return mission, 1993

The United States' Mars Exploration Program, formed after Mars Observer's failure in September 1993, supported a Mars sample return. One architecture was proposed by Glenn J. MacPherson in the early 2000s.

In 1996, the possibility of life on Mars was raised when apparent microfossils were thought to have been found in the Martian meteorite ALH84001. This hypothesis was eventually rejected, but led to a renewed interest in a Mars sample return.

In the mid-1990s, NASA funded JPL and Lockheed Martin to study affordable small-scale MSR mission architectures including a concept to return 500 grams of Mars samples using a 100-kg MAV that would meet a small Mars orbiter for rendezvous and return to Earth. Robert Zubrin, a long-time advocate for human Mars missions, concluded in 1996 that the best approach to MSR would be launching directly to Earth using propellants made on Mars, because a rendezvous in Mars orbit would be too risky and he estimated that a direct-return MAV would mass 500 kg, too heavy to send to Mars affordably if fully fueled on Earth. International peer reviewers concurred. In 1997, a detailed analysis of conventional small-scale rocket technology (both solid and liquid propellant) found that known propulsion components would be too heavy to build a MAV as lightweight as several hundred kilograms and "The application of launch vehicle design principles to the development of new hardware on a tiny scale" was suggested.

In 1998, JPL presented a design for a two-stage pressure-fed liquid bipropellant MAV that would be 600 kilograms or less at Mars liftoff, intended for a MSR mission in 2005. The same JPL author collaborated on a notional single-stage 200-kg MAV intended to be made small by using pump-fed propulsion to permit lightweight low-pressure liquid propellant tanks and compact high-pressure thrust chambers. This mass advantage of pump-fed operation was applied to a conceptual 100-kg MAV having a mass budget consistent with reaching Mars orbit using monopropellant, partly enabled by the simplicity of a single tank, also applicable to Mars landing typically done with monopropellant. The high-pressure thrusters and pump had previously been demonstrated in the 1994 flight of an experimental 21-kg rocket.

As of late 1999, the MSR mission was anticipated to be launched from Earth in 2003 and 2005. Each was to deliver a rover and a Mars ascent vehicle, and a French supplied Mars orbiter with Earth return capability was to be included in 2005. The 140-kg MAV, "in the process of being contracted to industry" at that time, was to include telemetry on its first stage and thrusters that would spin the vehicle to 300 RPM before separation of the simplified lightweight upper stage. Atop each MAV, a 3.6-kg, 16-cm diameter spherical payload would contain 500 grams of samples and have solar cells to power a long-life beacon to facilitate rendezvous with the Earth return orbiter. The orbiter would capture the sample containers delivered by both MAVs and place them in separate Earth entry vehicles. This mission concept, considered by NASA's Mars Exploration Program to return samples by 2008, was cancelled following a program review.

In mid-2006, the International Mars Architecture for the Return of Samples (iMARS) Working Group was chartered by the International Mars Exploration Working Group (IMEWG) to outline the scientific and engineering requirements of an internationally sponsored and executed Mars sample-return mission in the 2018–2023 time frame.

In October 2009, NASA and ESA established the Mars Exploration Joint Initiative to proceed with the ExoMars program, whose ultimate aim is "the return of samples from Mars in the 2020s". ExoMars's first mission was planned to launch in 2018 with unspecified missions to return samples in the 2020–2022 time frame. The cancellation of the caching rover MAX-C in 2011, and later NASA withdrawal from ExoMars, due to budget limitations, ended the mission. The pull-out was described as "traumatic" for the science community.

In early 2011, the US National Research Council's Planetary Science Decadal Survey, which laid out mission planning priorities for the period 2013–2022, declared an MSR campaign its highest priority Flagship Mission for that period. In particular, it endorsed the proposed Mars Astrobiology Explorer-Cacher (MAX-C) mission in a "descoped" (less ambitious) form. This mission plan was officially cancelled in April 2011.

A key mission requirement for the Mars 2020 Perseverance rover mission was that it help prepare for MSR. The rover landed on 18 February 2021 in Jezero Crater to collect samples and store them in 43 cylindrical tubes for later retrieval.

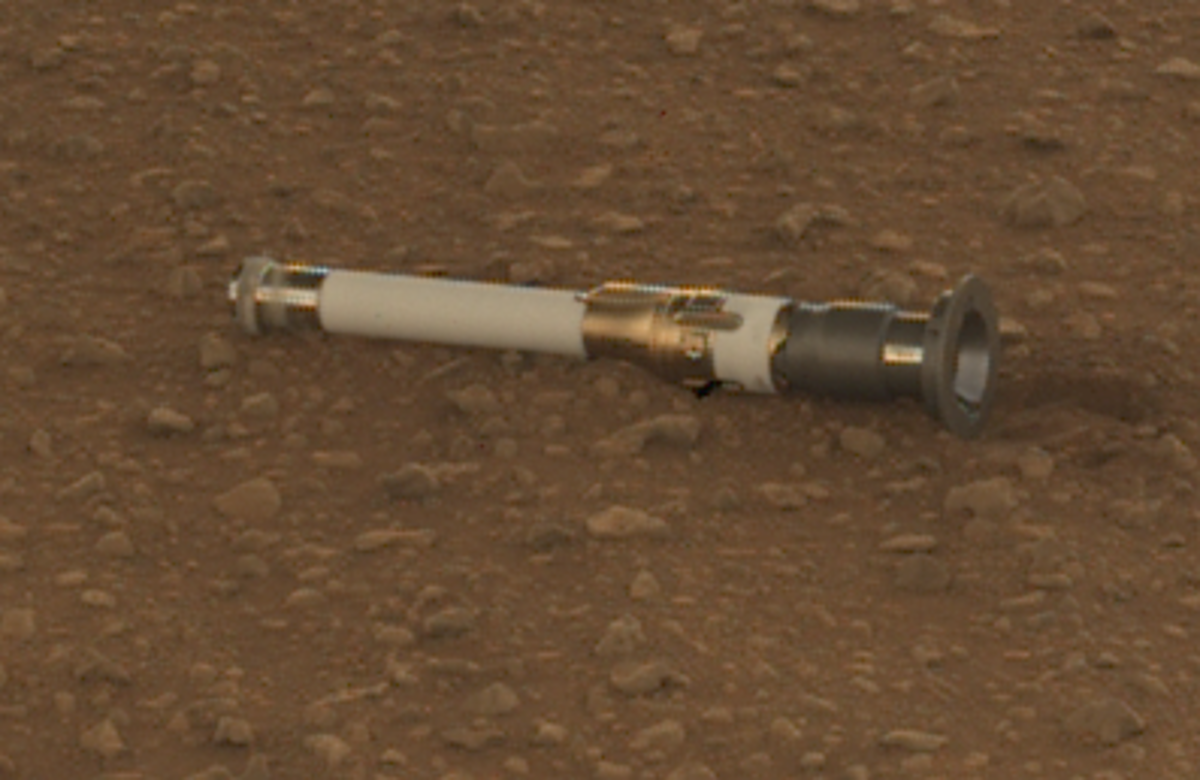
Image of one of the sample tubes. Its appearance has been noted to have similarities with a Lightsaber from the Star Wars movies.

=== Mars 2020 mission ===
Perseverance rover

The Mars 2020 mission landed the Perseverance rover in the Jezero crater in February 2021. It has collected multiple samples and will continue to do so, packing them into cylinders for later return in the MSR Campaign. Jezero appears to be an ancient lakebed, suitable for ground sampling. It is also assigned the task to return the samples directly to the Sample Return lander, considering its potential mission longevity.

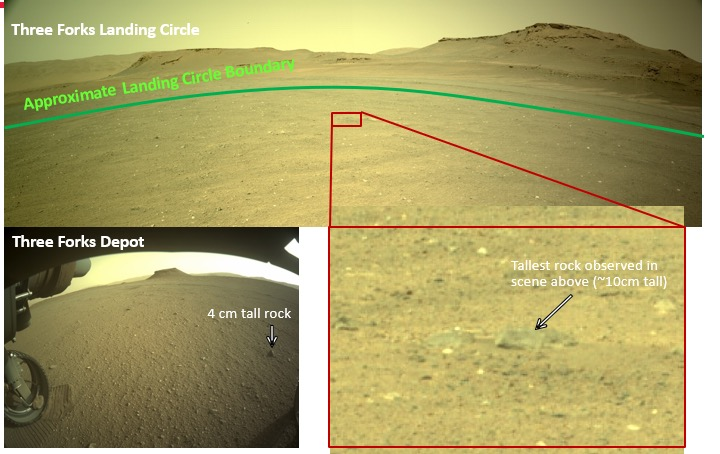
Mars Sample Depot at 3 forks

In support of the NASA-ESA Mars Sample Return, rock, regolith (Martian soil), and atmosphere samples are being cached by Perseverance. As of July 2025, 33 out of 43 sample tubes have been filled, including 8 igneous rock samples, 13 sedimentary rock sample tubes, 3 Igneous/Impactite rock sample tubes, a Serpentinite rock sample tube, a Silica-cemented carbonate rock sample tube, two regolith sample tubes, an atmosphere sample tube, and three witness tubes. Before launch, 5 of the 43 tubes were designated "witness tubes" and filled with materials that would capture particulates in the ambient environment of Mars. Out of 43 tubes, 3 witness sample tubes will not be returned to Earth and will remain on rover as the sample canister will only have 30 tube slots. Further, 10 of the 43 tubes are left as backups at the Three Forks Sample Depot.

However, after a project review critical of its cost and complexity, NASA announced that the Mars Sample Return project was "paused" as of November 13, 2023. In a teleconference on April 15, 2024, NASA Administrator Bill Nelson emphasized continuing the commitment to retrieving the samples. However, the $11 billion cost was deemed infeasible. NASA turned to industry and the Jet Propulsion Laboratory (JPL) to form a new, more fiscally feasible mission profile to retrieve the samples.

From 21 December 2022, Perseverance started a campaign to deposit 10 of its collected samples to the backup depot (Three Forks), to ensure that if Perseverance runs into problems, the MSR campaign could still succeed.

== Proposals ==
=== NASA–ESA ===
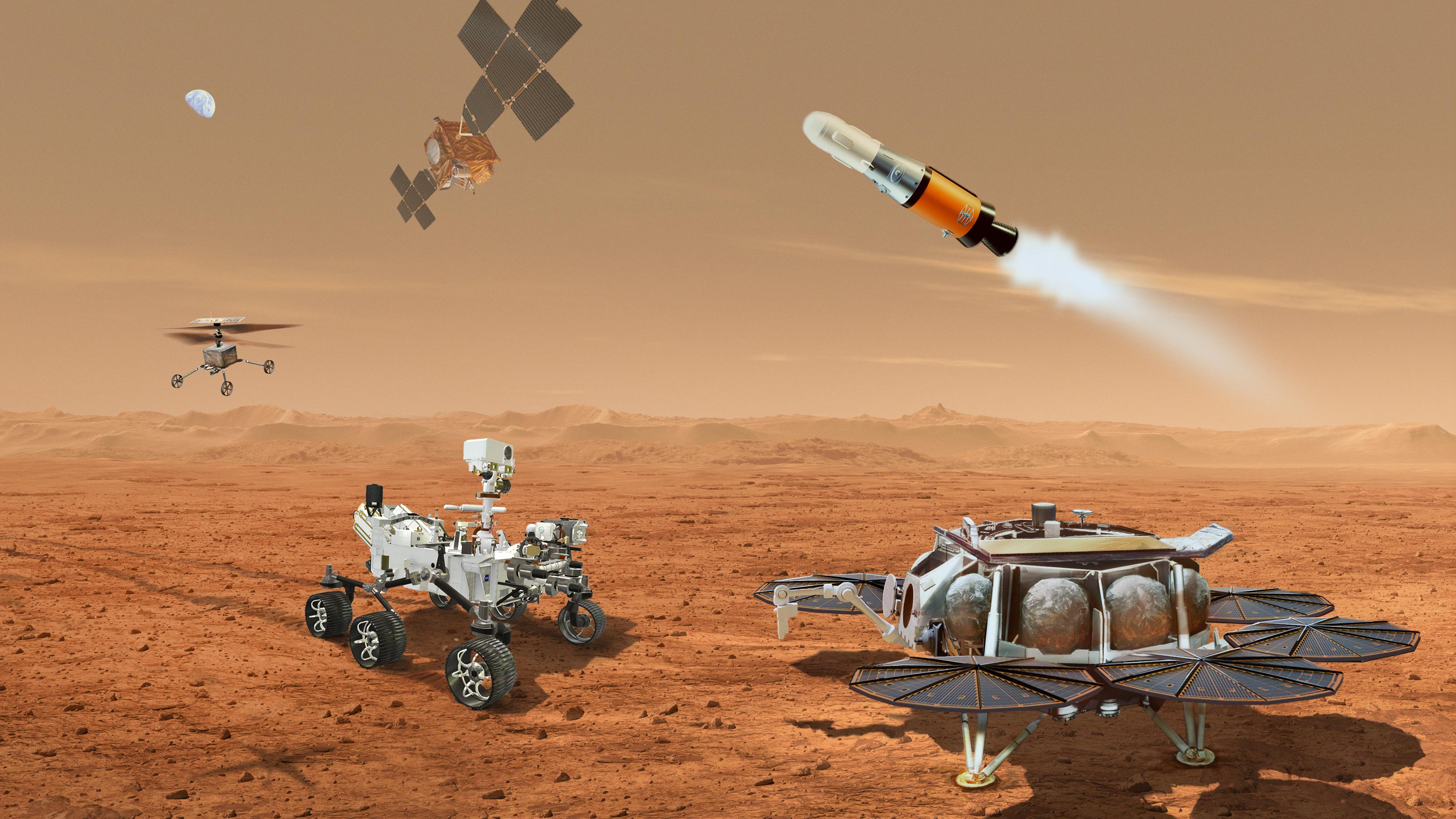
Mars Sample Return Program (artwork; 27 July 2022)

Mars Sample Return Campaign for bringing Mars Rock Samples Back to Earth

The NASA-ESA plan is to return samples using three missions: a sample collection mission (Perseverance) launched in 2020 and currently operational, a sample retrieval mission (Sample Retrieval Lander + Mars ascent vehicle + Sample Transfer arm + 2 Ingenuity class helicopters), and a return mission (Earth Return Orbiter).

Although NASA and ESA's proposal is still in the design stage, the first leg of gathering samples is currently being executed by the Perseverance rover on Mars and components of the sample retrieval lander (second leg) are in testing phase on earth. The later phases were facing significant cost overruns as of August 2023. In November 2023, NASA was reported to have cut back the program due to a possible shortage of funds. As of January 2024, the plan was facing ongoing scrutiny due to budget and scheduling considerations, and a new overhaul plan was being pursued. In April 2024, NASA reported that the originally projected cost of $7 billion and expected sample return of 2033 was updated to an unacceptable $11 billion and return of 2040 instead, prompting the agency to search for a better solution.

=== China ===
China has announced plans for a Mars sample-return mission to be called Tianwen-3. The mission would launch in late-2028, with a lander and ascent vehicle on a Long March 5 and an orbiter and return module launched separately on a Long March 3B. Samples would be returned to Earth in July 2031.

A previous plan would have used a large spacecraft that could carry out all mission phases, including sample collection, ascent, orbital rendezvous, and return flight. This would have required the super-heavy-lift Long March 9 launch vehicle. Another plan involved using Tianwen-1 to cache the samples for retrieval.

=== France ===
France has worked towards a sample return for many years. This included concepts of an extraterrestrial sample curation facility for returned samples, and numerous proposals. They worked on the development of a Mars sample-return orbiter, which would capture and return the samples as part of a joint mission with other countries.

=== Japan ===
On 19 October 2026, the Japanese Aerospace Exploration Agency (JAXA) launched a named Martian Moons Exploration (MMX) to retrieve samples from Phobos. Phobos's orbit is closer to Mars and its surface may have captured particles blasted from Mars. The return to Earth is planned for 2031. Japan has also shown interest in participating in an international Mars sample-return mission.

=== Russia ===
A Russian Mars sample-return mission concept is Mars-Grunt. It adopted Fobos-Grunt design heritage. 2011 plans envisioned a two-stage architecture with an orbiter and a lander (but no roving capability), with samples gathered from around the lander by a robotic arm.

== Back contamination ==
OSIRIS-REx sample return capsule in Utah from asteroid 101955 Bennu

Whether life forms exist on Mars is unresolved. Thus, MSR could potentially transfer viable organisms to Earth, resulting in back contamination — the introduction of extraterrestrial organisms into Earth's biosphere. The scientific consensus is that the potential for large-scale effects, either through pathogenesis or ecological disruption, is small. Returned samples would be treated as potentially biohazardous until scientists decide the samples are safe. The goal is that the probability of release of a Mars particle is less than one in a million.

The proposed NASA Mars sample-return mission will not be approved by NASA until the National Environmental Policy Act (NEPA) process has been completed. Furthermore, under the terms of Article VII of the Outer Space Treaty and other legal frameworks, were a release of organisms to occur, the releasing nation(s) would be liable for any resultant damages.

The sample-return mission would be tasked with preventing contact between the Martian environment and the exterior of the sample containers.

In order to eliminate the risk of parachute failure, the current plan is to use the thermal protection system to cushion the capsule upon impact (at terminal velocity). The sample container would be designed to withstand the force of impact. To receive the returned samples, NASA proposed a custom Biosafety Level 4 containment facility, the Mars Sample-Return Receiving facility (MSRRF).

Other scientists and engineers, notably Robert Zubrin of the Mars Society, argued in the Journal of Cosmology that contamination risk is functionally zero leaving little need to worry. They cite, among other things, lack of any known incident although trillions of kilograms of material have been exchanged between Mars and Earth via meteorite impacts.

The International Committee Against Mars Sample Return (ICAMSR) is an advocacy group led by Barry DiGregorio, that campaigns against a Mars sample-return mission. While ICAMSR acknowledges a low probability for biohazards, it considers the proposed containment measures to be unsafe. ICAMSR advocates more in situ studies on Mars, and preliminary biohazard testing at the International Space Station before the samples are brought to Earth. DiGregorio also supports a view that several pathogens – such as common viruses – originate in space and probably caused some mass extinctions and pandemics. These claims connecting terrestrial disease and extraterrestrial pathogens have been rejected by the scientific community.

== See also ==
- Timeline of Solar System exploration
