= Comet dust =

Cosmic dust that originates from a comet

Comet dust is cosmic dust that originates from a comet. Comet dust can provide clues to comets' origin. When the Earth passes through a comet dust trail, it can produce a meteor shower.

== Physical characteristics ==
=== Size ===
The majority of dust from comet activity is sub-micrometer to roughly micrometer in size. However, this fraction is short-lived, as radiation pressure causes them to blow out of the Solar System or spiral inwards.

The next size class is large, "fluffy" or "cluster-type" aggregates of the above grains. These are typically 20-100 micrometers, a size not arbitrary but observed as the porous aggregates tend to fracture or compact.

Larger particles are micrometeoroids, not dust. In the absence of a definition from the IAU, groups devised their own definitions of dust: smaller than 100 micrometers, 50, 40, 30, and 20 microns, and <10 μm. Some of these dust/micrometeorite definitions are approximate or ambiguous, some overlapping or self-conflicting.

The IAU released a formal statement in 2017. Meteoroids are 30 micrometers to 1 meter, dust is smaller, and the term "micrometeoroid" is discouraged (though not micrometeorite). The IMO noted the new definition, but still displays a prior definition on their site. The Meteoritical Society site retains its prior definition, 0.001 cm. The AMS has posted no rigorous definition.

=== Composition ===
Dust is generally chondritic in composition. Its monomers contain mafic silicates, such as olivine and pyroxene. Silicates are rich in high-condensation temperature forsterite and enstatite. As these condense quickly, they tend to form very small particles, not merging droplets.

As with chondritic meteoroids, particles contain Fe(Ni) sulfide and GEMS (glass with embedded metal and sulfides)

Various amounts of organics (CHON) are present. Though organics are cosmically abundant, and were widely predicted to exist in comets, they are spectrally indistinct in most telescopes. Organics were only confirmed via mass spectrometry during the Halley flybys. Some organics are in the form of PAHs (Polycyclic Aromatic Hydrocarbons).

Very small inclusions of presolar grains (PSGs) may be found.

== Dust and comet origin ==
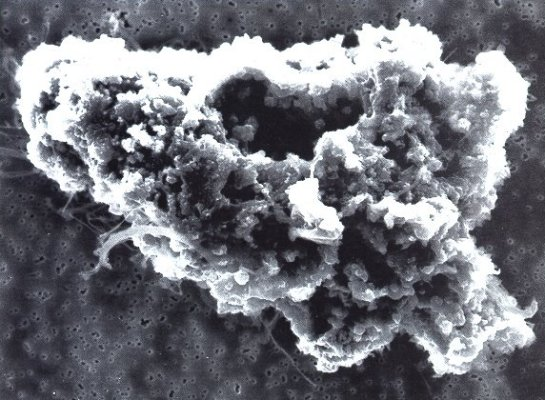
Microscopic view of comet dust particle

The models for the origin of comets are:

1. the interstellar model,
2. the Solar System model,
3. primordial rubble piles,
4. aggregation of planetesimals in the dust disk around the Uranus–Neptune region,
5. cold shells of material swept out by the protostellar wind.

Bulk properties of the comet dust such as density as well as the chemical composition can distinguish between the models. For example, the isotopic ratios of comet and of interstellar dust are very similar, indicating a common origin.

The 1) interstellar model says that ices formed on dust grains in the dense cloud that preceded the Sun. The mix of ice and dust then aggregated into a comet without appreciable chemical modification. J. Mayo Greenberg first proposed this idea in the 1970s.

In the 2) Solar System model, the ices that formed in the interstellar cloud first vaporized as part of the accretion disk of gas and dust around the protosun. The vaporized ices later resolidified and assembled into comets. So the comets in this model would have a different composition than those comets that were made directly from interstellar ice.

The 3) primordial rubble pile model for comet formation says that comets agglomerate in the region where Jupiter was forming.

Stardust's discovery of crystalline silicates in the dust of comet Wild 2 implies that the dust formed above glass temperature (> 1000 K) in the inner disk region around a hot young star, and was radially mixed in the solar nebula from the inner regions a larger distance from the star or the dust particle condensed in the outflow of evolved red giants or supergiants. The composition of the dust of comet Wild 2 is similar to the composition of dust found in the outer regions of the accretion disks around newly-forming stars.

A comet and its dust allow investigation of the Solar System beyond the main planetary orbits. Comets are distinguished by their orbits; long period comets have long elliptical orbits, randomly inclined to the plane of the Solar System, and with periods greater than 200 years. Short period comets are usually inclined less than 30 degrees to the plane of the Solar System, revolve around the Sun in the same counterclockwise direction as the planets orbit, and have periods less than 200 years.

A comet will experience a range of diverse conditions as it traverses its orbit. For long period comets, most of the time it will be so far from the Sun that it will be too cold for evaporation of ices to occur. When it passes through the terrestrial planet region, evaporation will be rapid enough to blow away small grains, but the largest grains may resist entrainment and stay behind on the comet nucleus, beginning the formation of a dust layer. Near the Sun, the heating and evaporation rate will be so great, that no dust can be retained. Therefore, the thickness of dust layers covering the nuclei of a comet can indicate how closely and how often a comet's perihelion travels are to the Sun. If a comet has an accumulation of thick dust layers, it may have frequent perihelion passages that don't approach the Sun too closely.

A thick accumulation of dust layers might be a good description of all of the short period comets, as dust layers with thicknesses on the order of meters are thought to have accumulated on the surfaces of short-period comet nuclei. The accumulation of dust layers over time would change the physical character of the short-period comet. A dust layer both inhibits the heating of the cometary ices by the Sun (the dust is impenetrable by sunlight and a poor conductor of heat), and slows the loss of gases from the nucleus below. A comet nucleus in an orbit typical of short period comets would quickly decrease its evaporation rate to the point that neither a coma or a tail would be detectable and might appear to astronomers as a low-albedo near-Earth asteroid.

== Further assemblages and bodies ==
Dust particles, aided by ices and organics, form "aggregates" (less often, "agglomerates") of 30 to hundreds of micrometers. These are fluffy, due to the imperfect packing of cluster-type (large) dust particles, and their subsequent, imperfect packing into aggregates.

The next size category is pebbles, of millimeters to centimeters scale. Pebbles were inferred at 103P/Hartley 2, and imaged directly at 67P/Churyumov-Gerasimenko. Astrophysical use of the word "pebble" differs from its geological meaning. In turn, the next-larger geological term, "cobble," has been skipped by Rosetta scientists.

Even larger bodies are "boulders" (decimeter-scale and above) or "chunks." These are rarely seen in the coma, as gas pressure is often insufficient to lift them to significant altitude or escape velocity.

The building blocks of comets are the putative cometesimals, analogous to planetesimal. Whether the actual cometesimals/planetesimals were pebble-scale, boulder-scale, or otherwise has been a key topic in Solar System and exoplanet research.

=== (Mis)Use of the term "dust" ===
At best, "dust" is a collective noun for the non-gas portion of the coma and tail(s). At worst, the term is an English usage, understood well by astronomers in the field, but not to the general public, teachers, and scientists from other fields. The larger solids are more properly called "debris" or, for all non-gases, the general "particles" or "grains."

=== Comet 2P/Encke ===
Encke is officially a dust-poor, gas-rich comet. Encke actually emits most of its solid mass as meteoroids or "rocks," not dust. ISO measured no infrared evidence of a classical cometary dust tail due to small particles.
