= Discovery 4 =

Discovery 4

- Land Rover Discovery 4, a second-generation Discovery SUV car model by Land Rover.
- Stardust (spacecraft), the fourth mission of the Discovery program.
