= 5535 Annefrank =

Florian asteroid

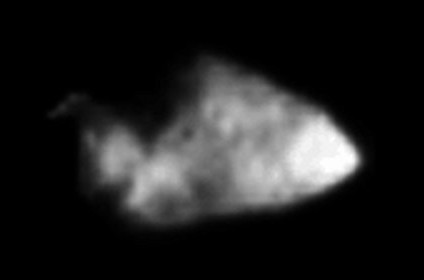
- Annefrank viewed by Stardust in 2002

Discovery
- Discovered by: Karl Wilhelm Reinmuth
- Discovery site: Heidelberg Obs.
- Discovery date: 23 March 1942

Designations
- Named after: Anne Frank (Holocaust victim)
- Alternative designations: 1942 EM · 1978 EK_{6} 1986 TV_{14} · 1991 BO_{2}
- Minor planet category: main-belt · Flora

Orbital characteristics
- Epoch 4 September 2017 (JD 2458000.5)
- Uncertainty parameter 0
- Observation arc: 75.02 yr (27,400 days)
- Aphelion: 2.3527 AU
- Perihelion: 2.0721 AU
- Semi-major axis: 2.2124 AU
- Eccentricity: 0.0634
- Orbital period (sidereal): 3.29 yr (1,202 days)
- Mean anomaly: 23.021°
- Mean motion: 0° 17^{m} 58.2^{s} / day
- Inclination: 4.2473°
- Longitude of ascending node: 120.64°
- Argument of perihelion: 9.1351°

Physical characteristics
- Dimensions: (6.6 x 5.0 x 3.4 km); 4.34±0.23 km 4.8 km 4.94 km (calculated)
- Synodic rotation period: 15.12 h 15.156±0.0474 h 21.33±0.990 h
- Geometric albedo: 0.21±0.03; 0.24 (assumed); 0.279±0.092; 0.311±0.056
- Spectral type: S
- Absolute magnitude (H): 13.650±0.120 (R) · 13.679±0.001 (R) · 13.7 · 13.88±0.32

Animation of Stardust 's trajectory from 7 February 1999 to 7 April 2011 Stardust · 81P/Wild · Earth · 5535 Annefrank · Tempel 1

5535 Annefrank (/ˌænˈfræŋk/ an-FRANK), provisional designation 1942 EM, is a stony Florian asteroid and suspected contact binary from the inner asteroid belt, approximately 4.5 kilometers in diameter. It was used as a target to practice the flyby technique that the Stardust space probe would later use on the comet Wild 2.

The asteroid was discovered 23 March 1942, by German astronomer Karl Reinmuth at Heidelberg Observatory in southwest Germany. It was named after Anne Frank, a victim of the Holocaust.

== Orbit and classification ==
Annefrank is a member of the Flora family, one of the largest collisional populations of stony asteroids in the main-belt. It orbits the Sun in the inner main-belt at a distance of 2.1–2.4 AU once every 3 years and 3 months (1,202 days). Its orbit has an eccentricity of 0.06 and an inclination of 4° with respect to the ecliptic.

The body's observation arc begins at Crimea–Nauchnij in 1978, with its identification as 1978 EK6, 36 years after its official discovery observation at Heidelberg.

== Physical characteristics ==
Annefrank has been characterized as a common S-type asteroid.

=== Diameter, albedo and shape ===
On 2 November 2002, the Stardust space probe flew past Annefrank at a distance of 3079 km. Its images show the asteroid to be 6.6 × 5.0 × 3.4 km, twice as big as previously thought, and its main body shaped like a triangular prism with several visible impact craters. From the photographs, the albedo of Annefrank was computed to be between 0.18 and 0.24. Preliminary analysis of the Stardust imagery suggests that Annefrank may be a contact binary, although other possible explanations exist for its observed shape.

=== Rotation and poles ===
In October 2006, ground-based photometric observations were used in an attempt to measure Annefrank's rotational period. Analysis of the ambiguous lightcurve gave a period of 15.12 hours and a brightness variation of 0.25 magnitude with two alternative period solutions of 12 and 22.8 hours, respectively (U=2).

In January 2014, photometric observations at the Palomar Transient Factory gave a rotation period of 15.156 and 21.33 hours with an amplitude of 0.17 and 0.20 magnitude, respectively (U=2/2).

The lightcurve data suggests that Annefrank is not Lambertian, meaning that surface features, such as shadows from boulders and craters, play a role in the object's perceived brightness and not just the asteroid's relative size when seen from that orientation.

The body's shortest axis is approximately aligned perpendicular to its orbital plane.

== Naming ==
This minor planet was named after Anne Frank, the German-Dutch-Jewish diarist who died in a Nazi concentration camp during the Second World War. The official naming citation was published by the Minor Planet Center on 14 May 1995 (M.P.C. 25230).
