= Tempel 1 =

Jupiter-family comet

9P/Tempel
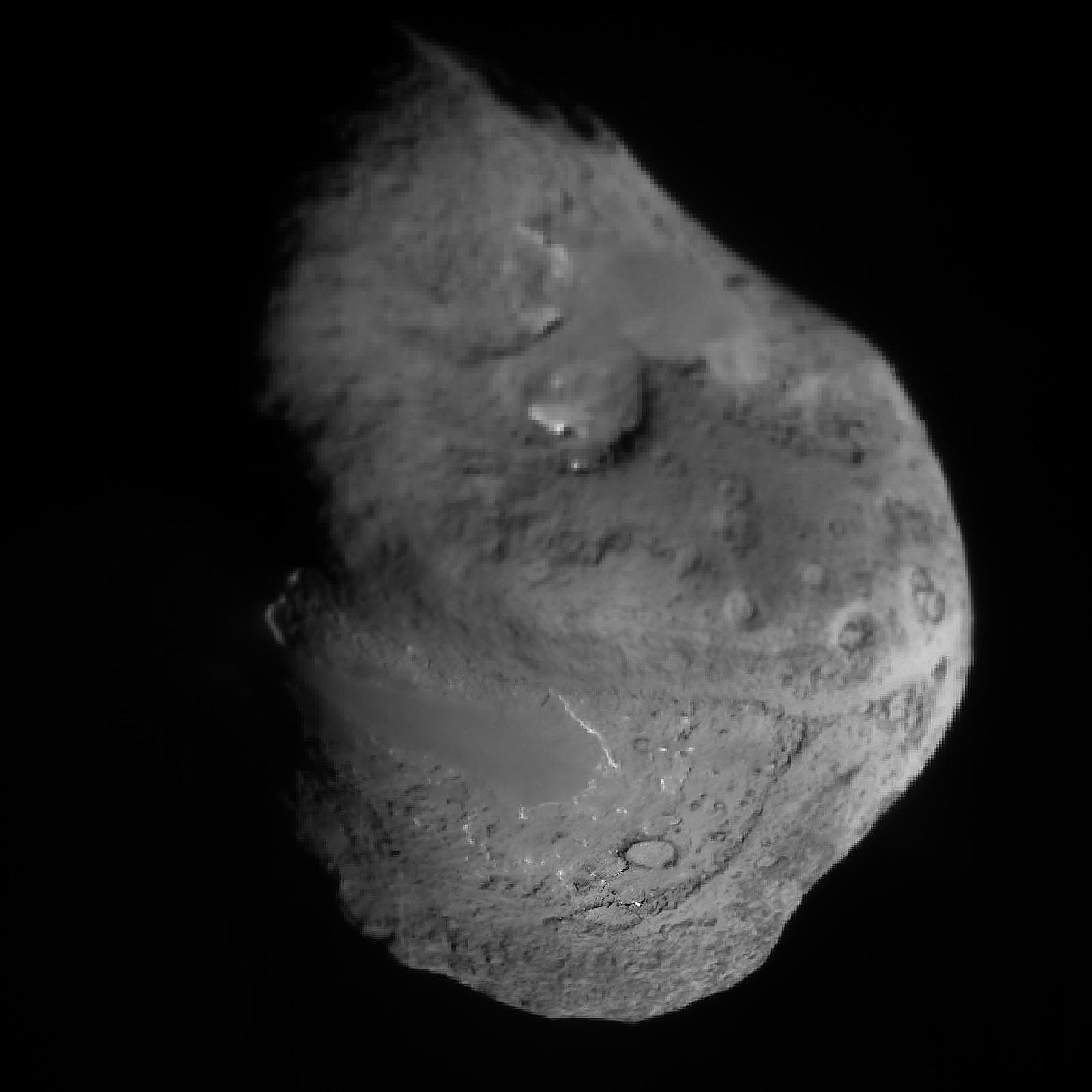
- Composite of images of nucleus obtained by the Deep Impact mission

Discovery
- Discovered by: Wilhelm Tempel
- Discovery date: 3 April 1867

Designations
- MPC designation: P/1867 G1, P/1873 G1; P/1967 L1, P/1972 A1
- Pronunciation: /ˈtɛmpəl/
- Alternative designations: Tempel 1; 1867 II, 1873 I, 1879 III; 1966 VII, 1972 V, 1978 II; 1983 XI, 1989 I, 1994 XIX; 1873a, 1879b, 1972a; 1977i, 1982j, 1989 I; 1987e1, 1993c

Orbital characteristics
- Epoch: 25 February 2023 (JD 2460000.5)
- Aphelion: 4.757 AU
- Perihelion: 1.545 AU (1.77 AU after 2024 Jupiter approach)
- Semi-major axis: 3.151 AU
- Eccentricity: 0.5097
- Orbital period: 5.59 years
- Inclination: 10.474°
- Longitude of ascending node: 68.64°
- Argument of periapsis: 179.54°
- Last perihelion: 4 March 2022
- Next perihelion: 12 February 2028
- Earth MOID: 0.52 AU

Physical characteristics
- Dimensions: 7.6 km × 4.9 km (4.7 mi × 3.0 mi)
- Mass: 7.2×10^{13} to 7.9×10^{13} kg (Note: Using a spherical diameter of 6.25 km; volume of a sphere * a rubble pile density of 0.62 g/cm^{3} yields a mass (m=d*v) of 7.9×10^{13} kg)
- Mean density: 0.62 g/cm^{3}
- Synodic rotation period: 40.7 hours
- Geometric albedo: 0.05
- Comet total magnitude (M1): 12.9

Tempel 1 (official designation: 9P/Tempel) is a Jupiter-family comet discovered by Wilhelm Tempel in 1867. It completes an orbit of the Sun every 5.6 years. Tempel 1 was the target of the Deep Impact space mission, which photographed a deliberate high-speed impact upon the comet in 2005. It was re-visited by the Stardust spacecraft on 14 February 2011, and came back to perihelion in August 2016. On 26 May 2024, it made a modest approach to Jupiter at a distance of 0.55 AU (82 million km), which lifted the perihelion distance. 9P will next come to perihelion on 12 February 2028 when it will be 1.77 AU (265 million km) from the Sun.

== Discovery and orbital history ==
Tempel 1 was discovered on April 3, 1867, by Wilhelm Tempel, who was working at Marseille. At the time of discovery, it approached perihelion once every 5.68 years (designations P/1867 G1 and 1867 II). It was subsequently observed in 1873 (P/1873 G1, 1873 I, 1873a) and in 1879 (1879 III, 1879b).

Photographic attempts during 1898 and 1905 failed to recover the comet, and astronomers surmised that it had disintegrated, when in reality, its orbit had changed. Tempel 1's orbit occasionally brings it sufficiently close to Jupiter to be altered, with a consequent change in the comet's orbital period. This occurred in 1881 (closest approach to Jupiter of 0.55 AU), lengthening the orbital period to 6.5 years. Perihelion also changed, increasing by 50 million km (31 million mi), to 2.1 AU, rendering the comet far less visible from Earth. Perihelion did not drop below 2 AU until 1944 after a 1941 approach to Jupiter.

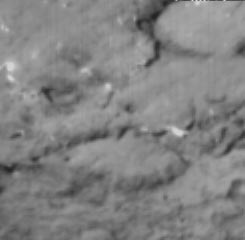
Detail of crater-like features on Comet Tempel 1 in image taken by Deep Impact's impactor

Tempel 1 was rediscovered in 1967 (as P/1967 L1, 1966 VII) after British astronomer Brian G. Marsden performed precise calculations of the comet's orbit that took into account Jupiter's perturbations. Marsden found that further close approaches to Jupiter in 1941 (0.41 AU) and 1953 (0.77 AU) had decreased both the perihelion distance and the orbital period to values smaller than when the comet was initially discovered (5.84 and 5.55 years, respectively). These approaches moved Tempel 1 into its present libration around the 1:2 resonance with Jupiter. Despite an unfavorable 1967 return, Elizabeth Roemer of the Catalina Observatory took several photographs. Initial inspection revealed nothing, but in late 1968 she found a 8 June 1967 exposure (Tempel 1 had passed perihelion in January) that held the image of an 18th magnitude diffuse object very close to where Marsden had predicted the comet to be. At least two images are required for orbit computation, so the next return had to be awaited.

Roemer and L. M. Vaughn recovered the comet on 11 January 1972, from Steward Observatory (P/1972 A1, 1972 V, 1972a). The comet became widely observed, reached a maximum brightness of magnitude 11 during May, and was last seen on July 10. Since that time the comet has been seen at every apparition, in 1978 (1978 II, 1977i), 1983 (1983 XI, 1982j), 1989 (1989 I, 1987e1), 1994 (1994 XIUX, 1993c), 2000, and 2005.

== Physical characteristics ==
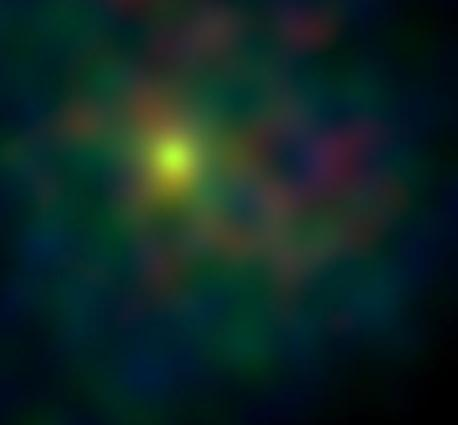
Tempel 1 in X-ray light by Chandra

Tempel 1 is not a bright comet; its brightest apparent magnitude since discovery has been 11, far below naked-eye visibility. Its nucleus measures 7.6 km × 4.9 km (4.7 mi × 3.0 mi). Measurements taken by the Hubble Space Telescope in visible light and the Spitzer Space Telescope in infrared light suggest a low albedo of only 4%. A two-day rotation rate was also determined. The comet was also seen to emit x-rays due to highly charged solar wind ions removing electrons via charge exchange from gases outflowing from Tempel 1's nucleus.

== Exploration ==
=== Deep Impact mission ===
Animation of Deep Impact's trajectory from 12 January 2005 to 8 August 2013 Deep Impact 1 Tempel 1 Earth 103P/Hartley

The head-on collision of comet 9P/Tempel and the Deep Impact impactor

On 4 July 2005 at 05:52 UTC (01:52 EDT), Tempel 1 was deliberately struck by one component of the NASA Deep Impact probe, one day before perihelion. The impact was photographed by the other component of the probe, which recorded a bright spray from the impact site. The impact was also observed by earthbound and space telescopes, which recorded a brightening of several magnitudes.

The crater that formed was not visible to Deep Impact due to the cloud of dust raised by the impact, but was estimated to be between 100–250 m (330–820 ft) in diameter and 30 m (98 ft) deep. Spitzer Space Telescope observations of the ejecta detected dust particles finer than human hair and discovered the presence of silicates, carbonates, smectite, metal sulfides (such as fool's gold), amorphous carbon and polycyclic aromatic hydrocarbons. Spitzer also detected water ice in the ejecta, consistent with surface water ice detected by Deep Impact's spectrometer instrument. The water ice came from 1 meter below the surface mantle (the devolatized layer around the nucleus).

=== NEXT mission ===
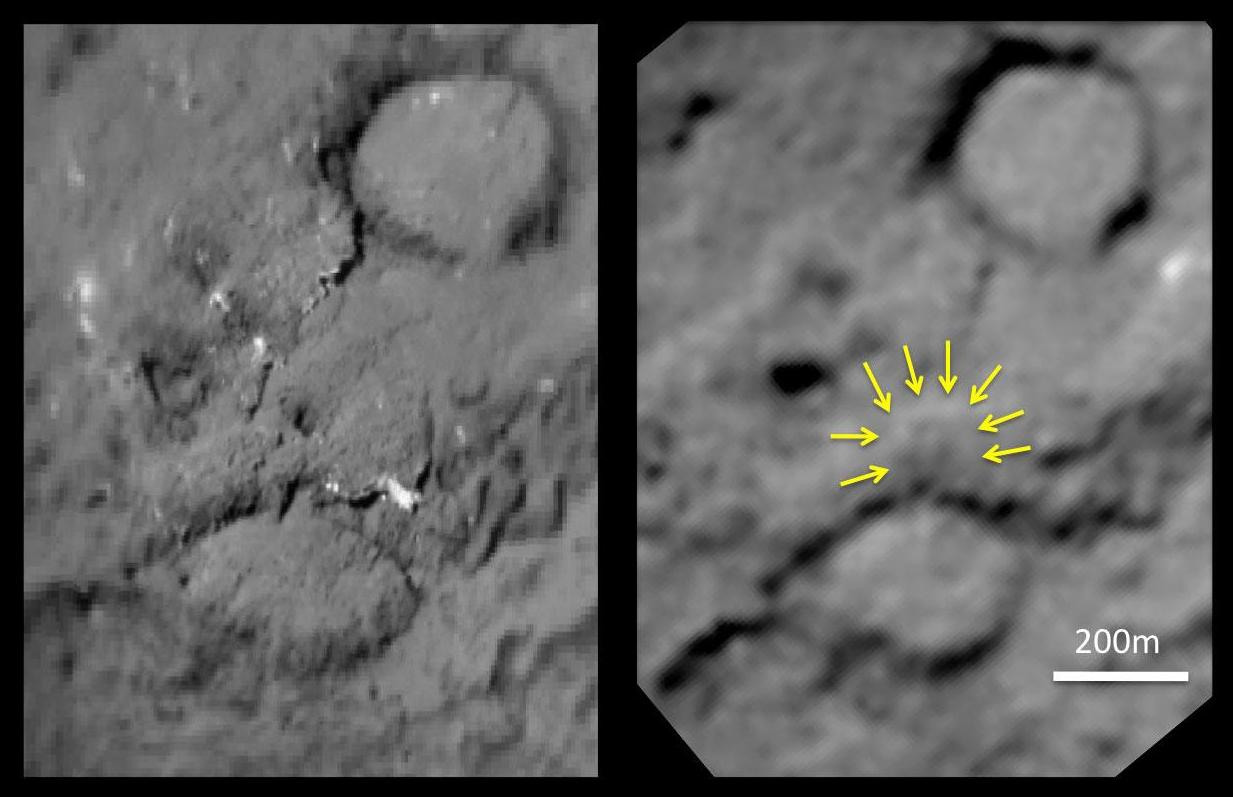
Before and after comparison images from Deep Impact and Stardust, showing the crater formed by Deep Impact on the right hand image.

Animation of Stardust's trajectory from 7 February 1999 to 7 April 2011 Stardust · 81P/Wild · Earth · 5535 Annefrank · Tempel 1

In part, because the crater formed during the Deep Impact collision could not be imaged during the initial flyby, on 3 July 2007, NASA approved the New Exploration of Tempel 1 (or NExT) mission. The low-cost mission utilized the already existing Stardust spacecraft, which had studied Comet Wild 2 in 2004. Stardust was placed into a new orbit so that it approached Tempel 1. It passed at a distance of approximately 181 km (112 mi) on February 15, 2011, 04:42 UTC. This was the first time that a comet was visited twice. (Note: Halley's Comet was visited five times in March 1986. However, Tempel 1 is the first comet revisited between its two different apparitions)

On February 15, NASA scientists identified the crater formed by Deep Impact in images from Stardust. The crater is estimated to be 150 m (490 ft) in diameter and has a bright mound in the center likely created when material from the impact fell back into the crater. Energy of impactor According to NASA "The impactor delivers 19 Gigajoules (that's 4.8 tons of TNT) of kinetic energy to excavate the crater. This kinetic energy is generated by the combination of the mass of the impactor (370 kg; 816 lbs) and its velocity when it impacts (~10.2 km/s)". According to NASA, "The energy from the impact will excavate a crater approximately 100m wide and 28m deep".

The geometry of the flyby allowed investigators to obtain considerably more three-dimensional information about the nucleus from stereo pairs of images than during Deep Impact's encounter. Scientists were able to quickly spot locations where an elevated flow-like formation of icy material on the comet's surface receded due to sublimation between encounters.

A study published in 2026 investigated an extensive smooth terrain approximately 2.5 km long located near the south pole of the nucleus. The authors proposed that this feature may have formed through the gravitational flow of surface materials following a period of enhanced cometary activity in the recent past, and suggested that it is connected to other smooth regions on the nucleus. The study also quantified the progressive erosion of this terrain caused by sublimation processes since its formation.

From Rizos et al. 2026. Simulation of gravitational flow on the nucleus of 9P/Tempel 1.

From Rizos et al. 2026.Final simulation of gravitational flow on the nucleus of 9P/Tempel 1.

== Close approaches ==
Comets are in unstable orbits that evolve due to perturbations and outgassing. Tempel 1 passed within 0.04 AU – or 5.9 million km (3.7 million mi) – of the dwarf planet Ceres on 11 November 2011. Then, as a Jupiter-family comet, it will spend years interacting with the giant planet Jupiter, and by October 2084 perihelion will be lifted as high as 1.98 AU (296 million km). Then perihelion will start dropping again and it will pass 0.0191 AU (2.86 million km; 1.78 million mi) from Mars on October 17, 2183.

9P/Tempel closest Mars approach on 2183-Oct-17
Date & time of closest approach	Mars distance (AU)	Sun distance (AU)	Velocity wrt Mars (km/s)	Velocity wrt Sun (km/s)	Uncertainty region (3-sigma)	Reference
2183-Oct-17 16:25 ± 2 hours	0.0191 AU (2.86 million km; 1.78 million mi)	1.506 AU (225.3 million km; 140.0 million mi)	6.58	29.92	± 5440 km	Horizons

== Gallery ==
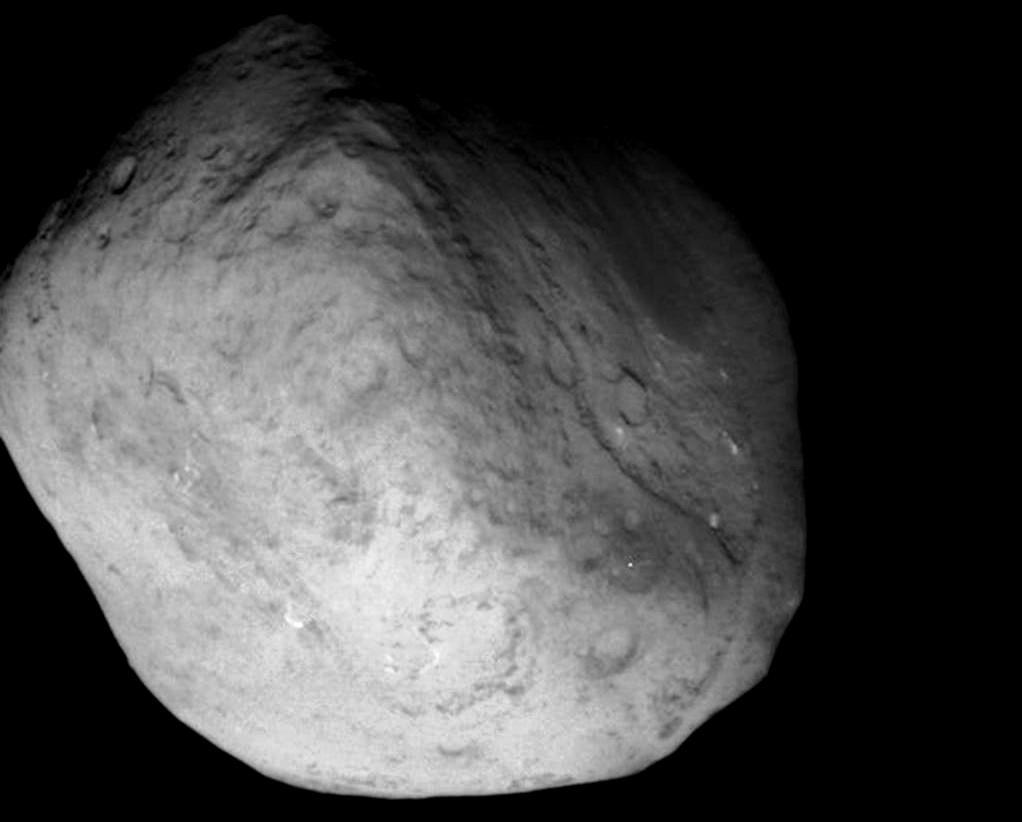
Tempel 1 from the Stardust spacecraft in 2011

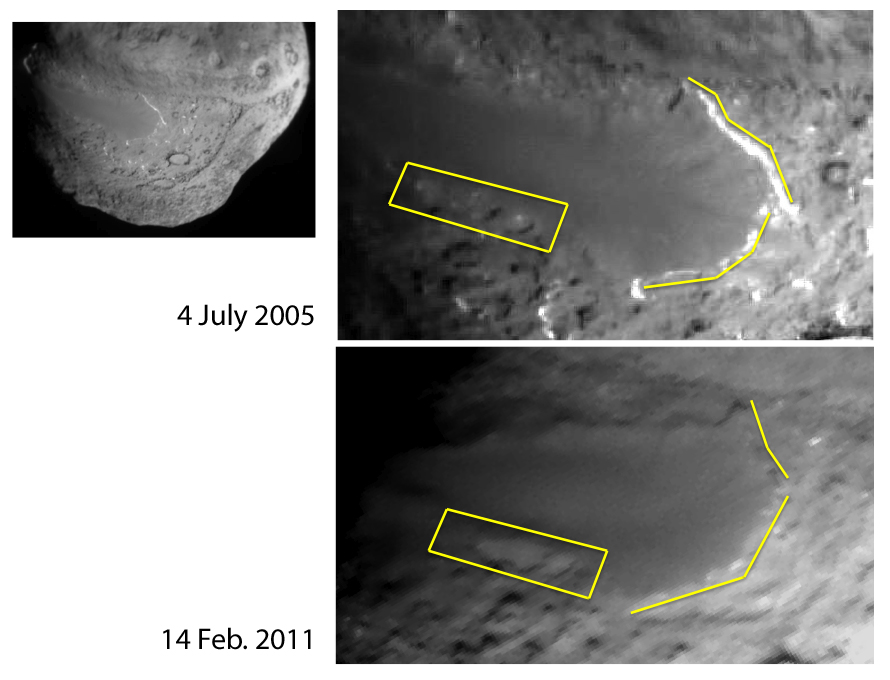
Comparison of Deep Impact and Stardust photos of a smooth elevated feature on the surface of the nucleus showing recession of icy cliffs at the margins.

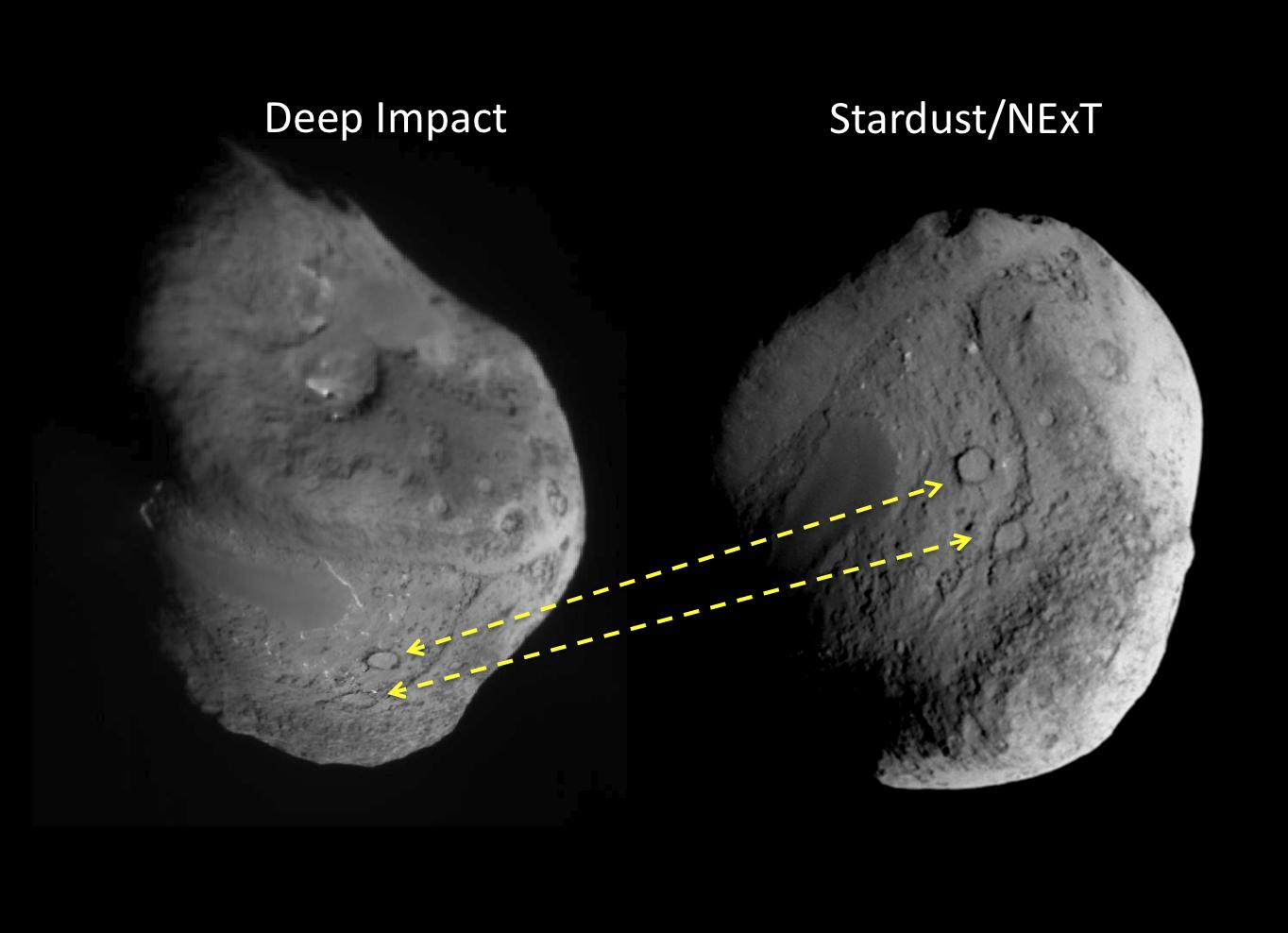
Different views of Tempel 1 seen by Deep Impact spacecraft (left) and Stardust (right). The dashed lines correlate the features.

== Notes ==
Numbered comets
Previous; 8P/Tuttle	Tempel 1	Next; 10P/Tempel
