= 81P/Wild =

Jupiter-family comet

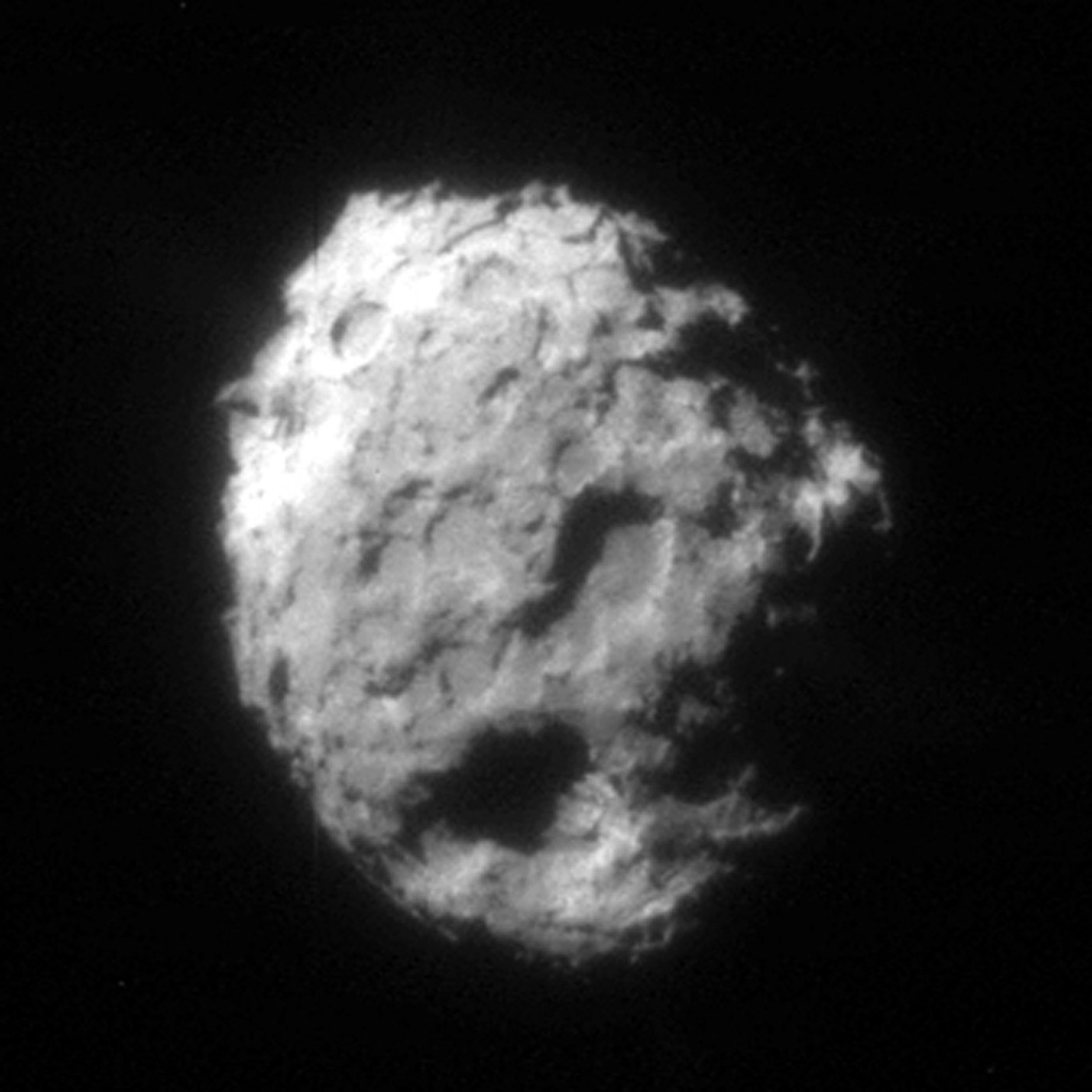
- The nucleus of Comet Wild 2 as seen by the Stardust mission in January 2004

Discovery
- Discovered by: Paul Wild
- Discovery site: Zimmerwald, Switzerland
- Discovery date: 6 January 1978

Designations
- MPC designation: P/1978 A2; P/1983 S1
- Pronunciation: /ˈvɪlt/
- Alternative designations: 1978 XI; 1984 XIV; 1990 XXVIII

Orbital characteristics
- Epoch: 17 October 2024 (JD 2460600.5)
- Observation arc: 46.67 years (Note: Observation arc from the Minor Planet Center database covering dates from 6 January 1978 until 7 September 2024.)
- Number of observations: 7,963
- Aphelion: 5.307 AU
- Perihelion: 1.597 AU
- Semi-major axis: 3.452 AU
- Eccentricity: 0.53739
- Orbital period: 6.414 years
- Inclination: 3.237°
- Longitude of ascending node: 136.09°
- Argument of periapsis: 41.568°
- Mean anomaly: 103.17°
- Last perihelion: 15 December 2022
- Next perihelion: 14 May 2029
- T_{Jupiter}: 2.879
- Earth MOID: 0.601 AU
- Jupiter MOID: 0.012 AU

Physical characteristics
- Dimensions: 5.5 km × 4.0 km × 3.3 km (3.4 mi × 2.5 mi × 2.1 mi)
- Mass: 2.3 × 10^{13} kg (5.1 × 10^{13} lb) (Note: Using the volume of an ellipsoid of 5.5×4.0×3.3 km * a rubble pile density of 0.6 g/cm^{3} yields a mass (m=d*v) of 2.28×10^{13} kg)
- Mean density: 0.6 g/cm^{3} (37 lb/cu ft)
- Comet total magnitude (M1): 9.8
- Comet nuclear magnitude (M2): 12.9

Comet 81P/Wild, also known as Wild 2 (pronounced "vilt two") (/ˈvɪlt/ VILT), is a comet with a period of 6.4 years named after Swiss astronomer Paul Wild, who discovered it on January 6, 1978, using a 40-cm Schmidt telescope at Zimmerwald, Switzerland.

For most of its 4.5 billion-year lifetime, Wild 2 probably had a more distant and circular orbit. In September 1974, it passed within 1.0 million km (0.62 million mi) of the planet Jupiter, the strong gravitational pull of which perturbed the comet's orbit and brought it into the inner Solar System. Its orbital period changed from 43 years to about 6 years, and its perihelion is now about 1.59 AU (238 million km).

== Orbit ==
Prior to its encounter with Jupiter in 1974, the comet had an orbital period of around 43 years with an aphelion at around 25 AU and a perihelion of just under 5 AU. The encounter reduced the aphelion and perihelion to its present value of around 5 and 1.5 AU, respectively.

== Exploration ==
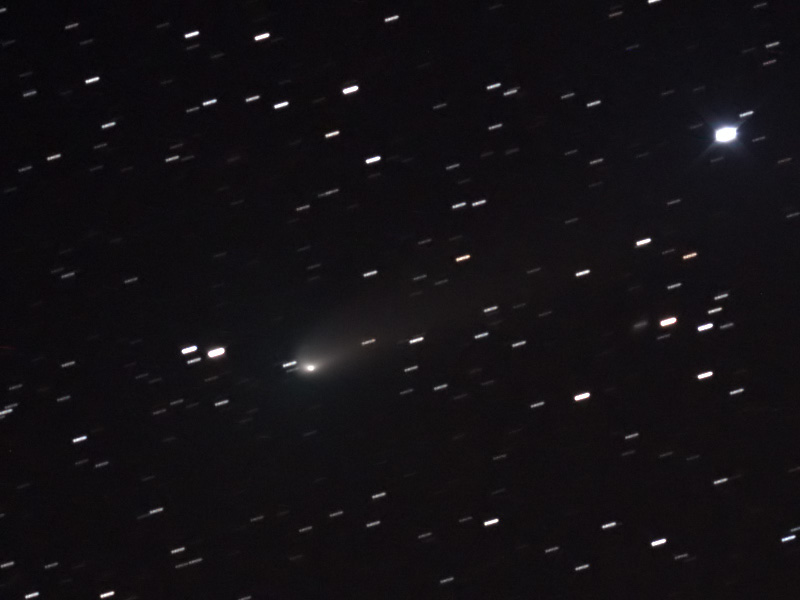
Wild 2 from Earth on 17 January 2010

Animation of Stardust 's trajectory from 7 February 1999 to 7 April 2011 Stardust · 81P/Wild · Earth · 5535 Annefrank · Tempel 1

NASA's Stardust Mission launched a spacecraft, named Stardust, on February 7, 1999. It flew by Wild 2 on January 2, 2004, and collected particle samples from the comet's coma, which were returned to Earth along with interstellar dust it collected during the journey. Seventy-two close-up shots were taken of Wild 2 by Stardust. They revealed a surface riddled with flat-bottomed depressions, with sheer walls and other features that range from very small to up to 2 km (1.2 mi) across. These features are believed to be caused by impact craters or gas vents. During Stardust's flyby, at least 10 gas vents were active. The comet itself has a diameter of 5 km (3.1 mi).

Stardust's "sample return canister" was reported to be in excellent condition when it landed in Utah, on January 15, 2006. A NASA team analyzed the particle capture cells and removed individual grains of comet and interstellar dust, then sent them to about 150 scientists around the globe. NASA is collaborating with The Planetary Society who will run a project called "Stardust@Home", using volunteers to help locate particles on the Stardust Interstellar Dust Collector (SIDC).

As of 2006, the composition of the dust has contained a wide range of organic compounds, including two that contain biologically usable nitrogen. Indigenous aliphatic hydrocarbons were found with longer chain lengths than those observed in the diffuse interstellar medium. No hydrous silicates or carbonate minerals were detected, which suggests a lack of aqueous processing of Wild 2 dust. Very few pure carbon (CHON) particles were found in the samples returned. A substantial amount of crystalline silicates such as olivine, anorthite and diopside were found, materials only formed at high temperature. This is consistent with previous observations of crystalline silicates both in cometary tails and in circumstellar disks at large distances from the star. Possible explanations for this high temperature material at large distances from Sun were summarised before the Stardust sample return mission by van Boekel et al.:

"Both in the Solar System and in circumstellar disks crystalline silicates are found at large distances from the star. The origin of these silicates is a matter of debate. Although in the hot inner-disk regions crystalline silicates can be produced by means of gas-phase condensation or thermal annealing, the typical grain temperatures in the outer-disk (2–20 au) regions are far below the glass temperature of silicates of approx 1,000 K. The crystals in these regions may have been transported outward through the disk or in an outward-flowing wind. An alternative source of crystalline silicates in the outer disk regions is in situ annealing, for example by shocks or lightning. A third way to produce crystalline silicates is the collisional destruction of large parent bodies in which secondary processing has taken place. We can use the mineralogy of the dust to derive information about the nature of the primary and/or secondary processes the small-grain population has undergone."

Results from a study reported in the September 19, 2008 issue of the journal Science has revealed an oxygen isotope signature in the dust that suggests an unexpected mingling of rocky material between the center and edges of the Solar System. Despite the comet's birth in the icy reaches of outer space beyond Pluto, tiny crystals collected from its halo appear to have been forged in the hotter interior, much closer to the Sun.

In April 2011, scientists from the University of Arizona discovered evidence of the presence of liquid water. They found iron and copper sulfide minerals that must have formed in the presence of water. The discovery is in conflict with the existing paradigm that comets never get warm enough to melt their icy bulk. Either collisions or radiogenic heating might have provided the necessary energy source.

On August 14, 2014, scientists announced the collection of possible interstellar dust particles from the Stardust spacecraft since returning to Earth in 2006.

== Further observations ==
It is estimated that between its apparitions of 2009–10 and 2022–23, the spin axis orientation of the nucleus of 81P/Wild had changed by at least 1.7 degrees. The Zwicky Transient Facility (ZTF) recorded at least two apparent outbursts from the comet in October 2022. The James Webb Space Telescope (JWST) observed the comet while it was about 1.85 AU (277 million km) from the Sun in March 2023. Infrared spectroscopy from JWST detected molecular emissions of H_{2}O, CH_{4}, C_{2}H_{6}, CH_{3}OH, CO, CO_{2}, ^{13}CO_{2}, OCS, HCN, and CN on its coma, consistent with those detected in previous apparitions.

== Gallery ==
The Inward Migration of 81P
Year (epoch)	Semi-major axis (AU)	Perihelion (AU)	Aphelion (AU)
1965	13	4.95	21 (Note: In 1951, comet 81P/Wild was at aphelion 21 AU (3.1 billion km) from the Sun.)
1978	3.36	1.49	5.24

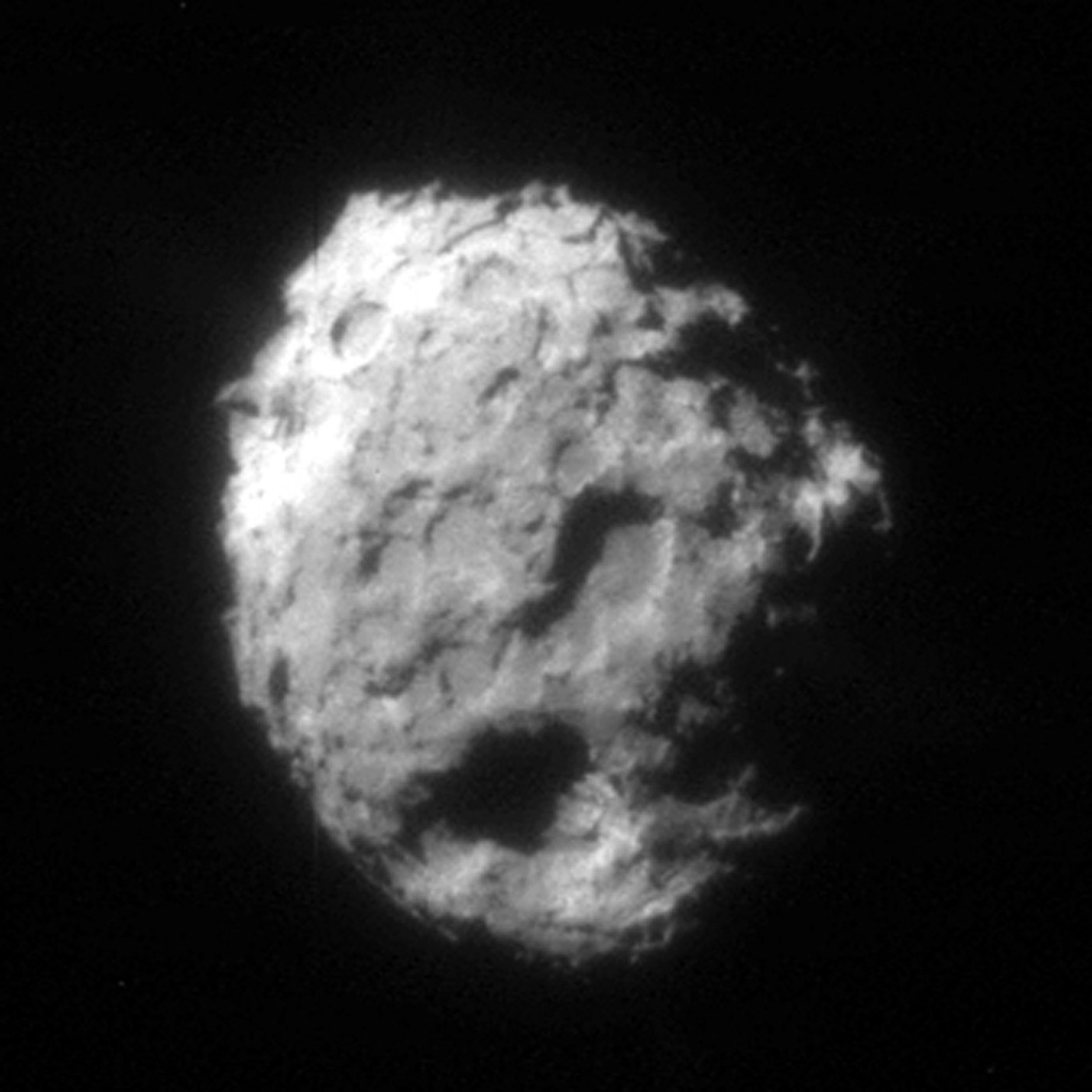
Photograph taken by Stardust spacecraft

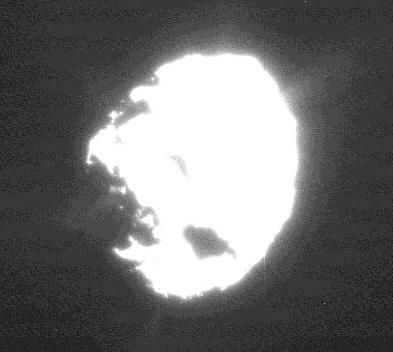
Details of the plume jets

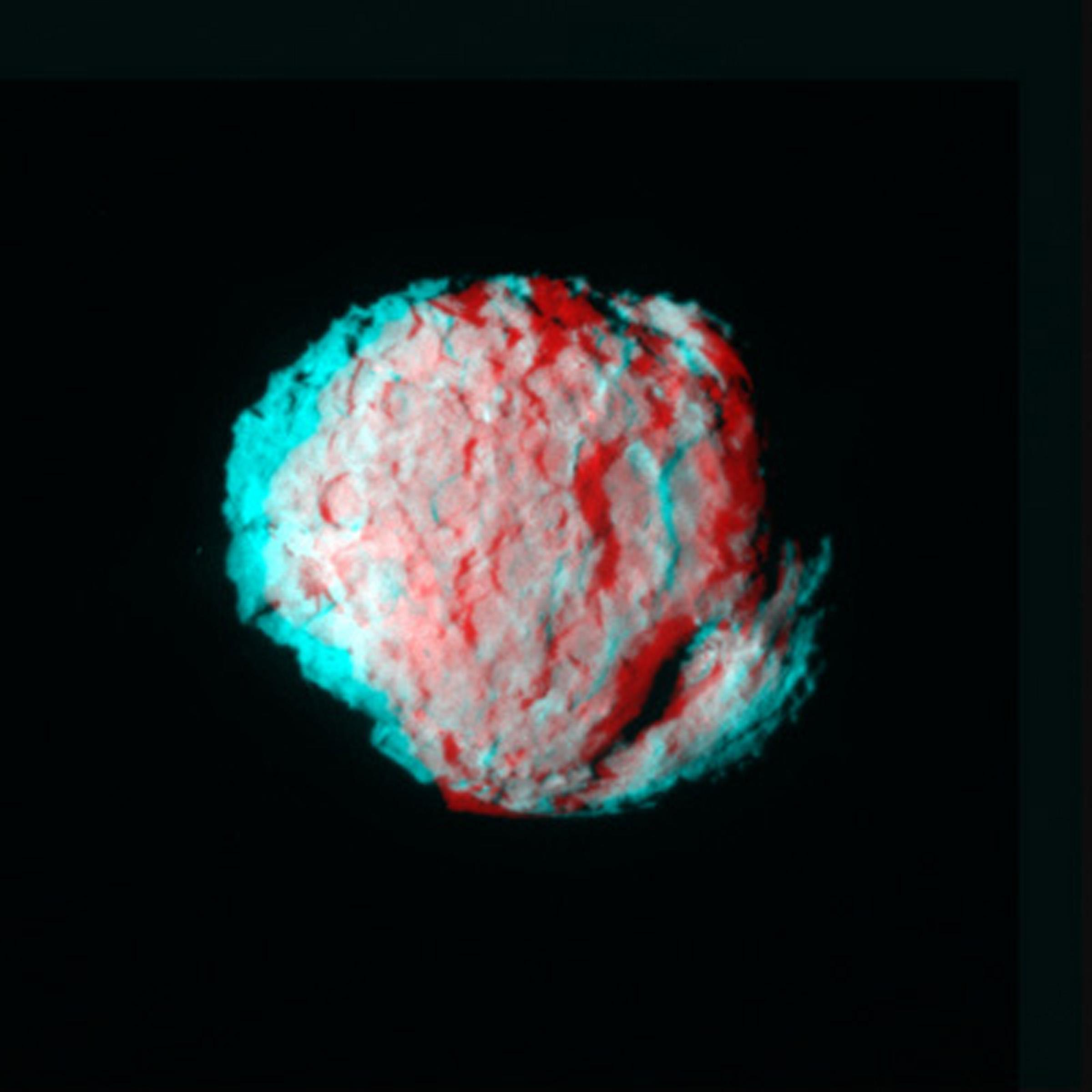
Red/green stereo anaglyph

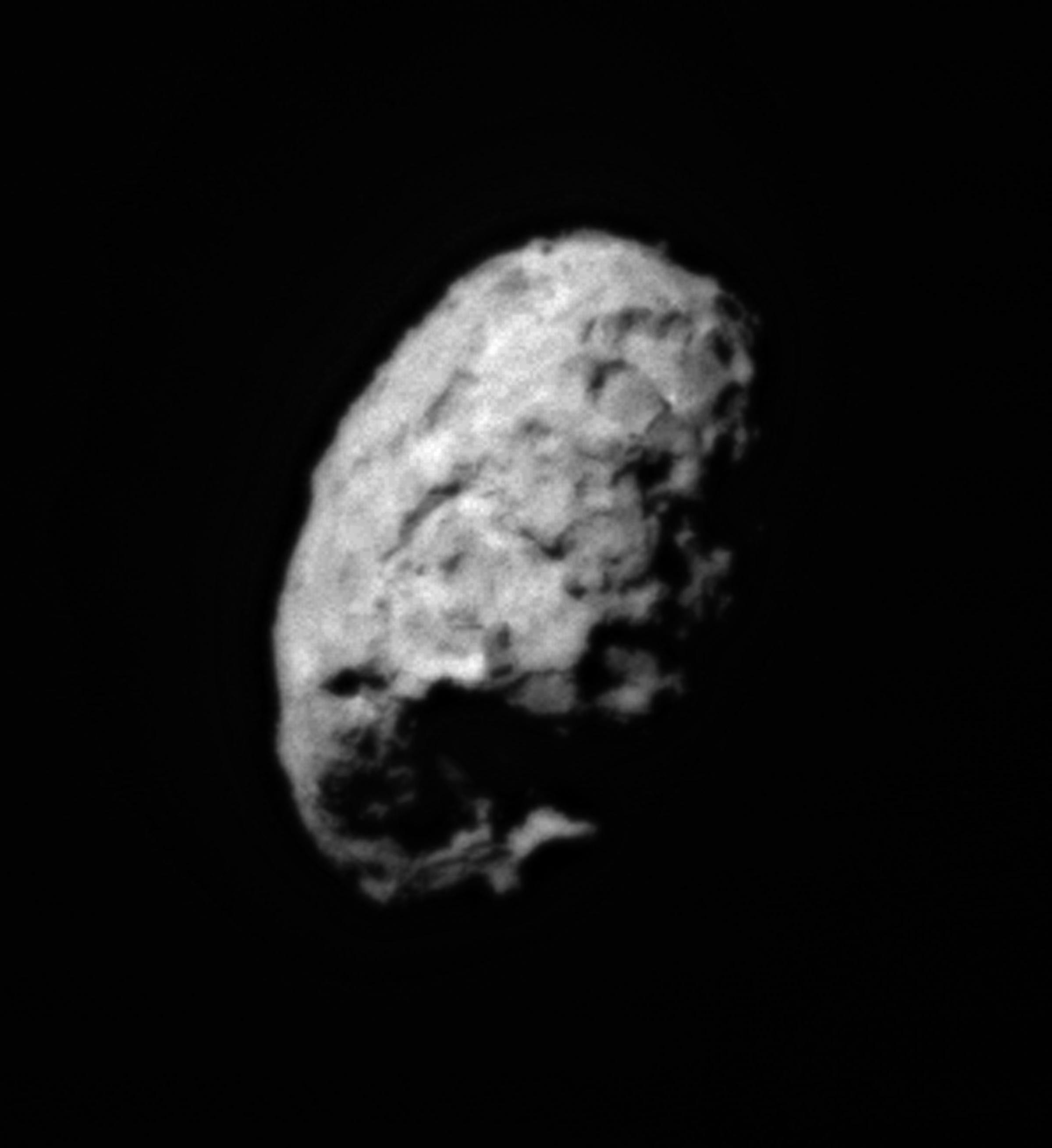
Stardust approach image

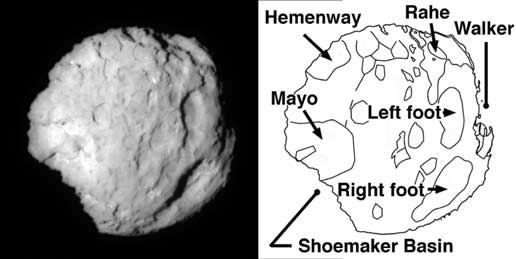

== See also ==
Wild 2 has a similar name to other objects:

- 116P/Wild
- 1941 Wild (1931 TN_{1})
- 63P/Wild
- 86P/Wild

== Notes ==
Numbered comets
Previous; 80P/Peters–Hartley	81P/Wild	Next; 82P/Gehrels
