= Stardust@home =

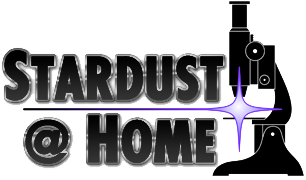
Stardust@home logo

Stardust@home is a citizen science project that encourages volunteers to search images for tiny interstellar dust impacts. The project began providing data for analysis on August 1, 2006.

From February to May 2000 and from August to December 2002, the Stardust spacecraft exposed its "Stardust Interstellar Dust Collector" (SIDC), a set of aerogel blocks about 0.1 m^{2} (1 ft^{2}) in total size, to interstellar dust. The collector media consist of 130 blocks of 1 and 3 cm thick silica-based aerogel mounted in aluminum cells.

In order to spot impacts of interstellar dust, just over 700,000 individual fields of the aerogel will have to be visually inspected using large magnification. Each field, which is composed of 40 images, will thus be termed a "focus movie". Stardust@home will try to achieve this by distributing the work among volunteers. Unlike distributed computing projects, it does not try to harness the processing power of many computers. It uses them only to distribute and present the tasks to humans. This approach is similar to the earlier Clickworkers project to find Martian craters.

Participants must pass a test to qualify to register to participate. After registering and passing the test, participants have access to the web-based "virtual microscope" which allows them to search each field for interstellar dust impacts by focusing up and down with a focus control.

As an incentive for volunteers, the first five phases of Stardust@home allowed the first individual to discover a particular interstellar dust particle to name it. Also, the discoverer could appear as a co-author on any scientific paper announcing the discovery of the particle. As of 2023, numerous peer-reviewed papers summarizing the results of the Stardust Interstellar Preliminary Examination (ISPE) that include these volunteers as co-authors have been published in Meteoritics & Planetary Science.

This focus movie shows what a particle track in the stardust aerogel might look like. The focus movie can be viewed in the Stardust Search Tutorial with the "virtual microscope". The tutorials use tracks of extraterrestrial particles that were captured in the ODCE collector on the Russian space station Mir and tracks of submicrometre dust particles shot into aerogel at 20 km/s using a Van de Graaff dust accelerator in Heidelberg, Germany. Real interstellar dust tracks may appear different from these. They may be deeper or shallower, wider or narrower.

== Phases ==
Stardust@home has been divided into six phases. Phase I became publicly available on August 1, 2006, Phase II in August 2007, Phase III in March 2010, Phase IV in July 2011, Phase V in May 2012, and Phase VI in June 2013.

Phase VI includes over 30,000 new "movies" representing eight aerogel tiles. The scoring method was also upgraded and, unlike the other phases, Stardust@home can no longer guarantee first finders of particles will be listed as co-authors on any scientific papers written about the discoveries.

== See also ==
- Clickworkers
- Crowdsourcing
- Zooniverse
- Galaxy Zoo
- The Daily Minor Planet
- SETI@home
