= Space exploration =

Investigation of outer space

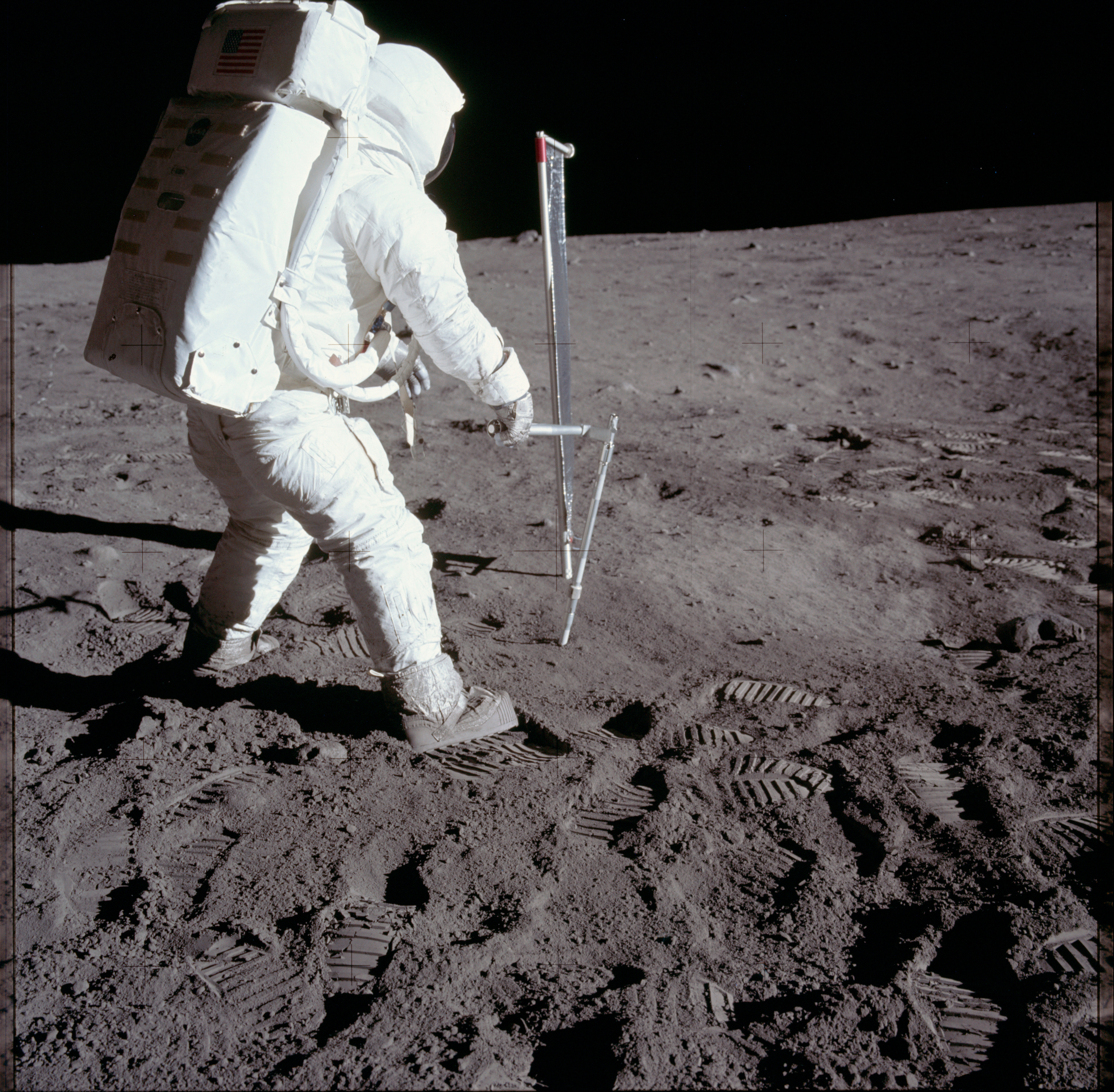
Buzz Aldrin taking a core sample of the Moon during the 1969 Apollo 11 mission

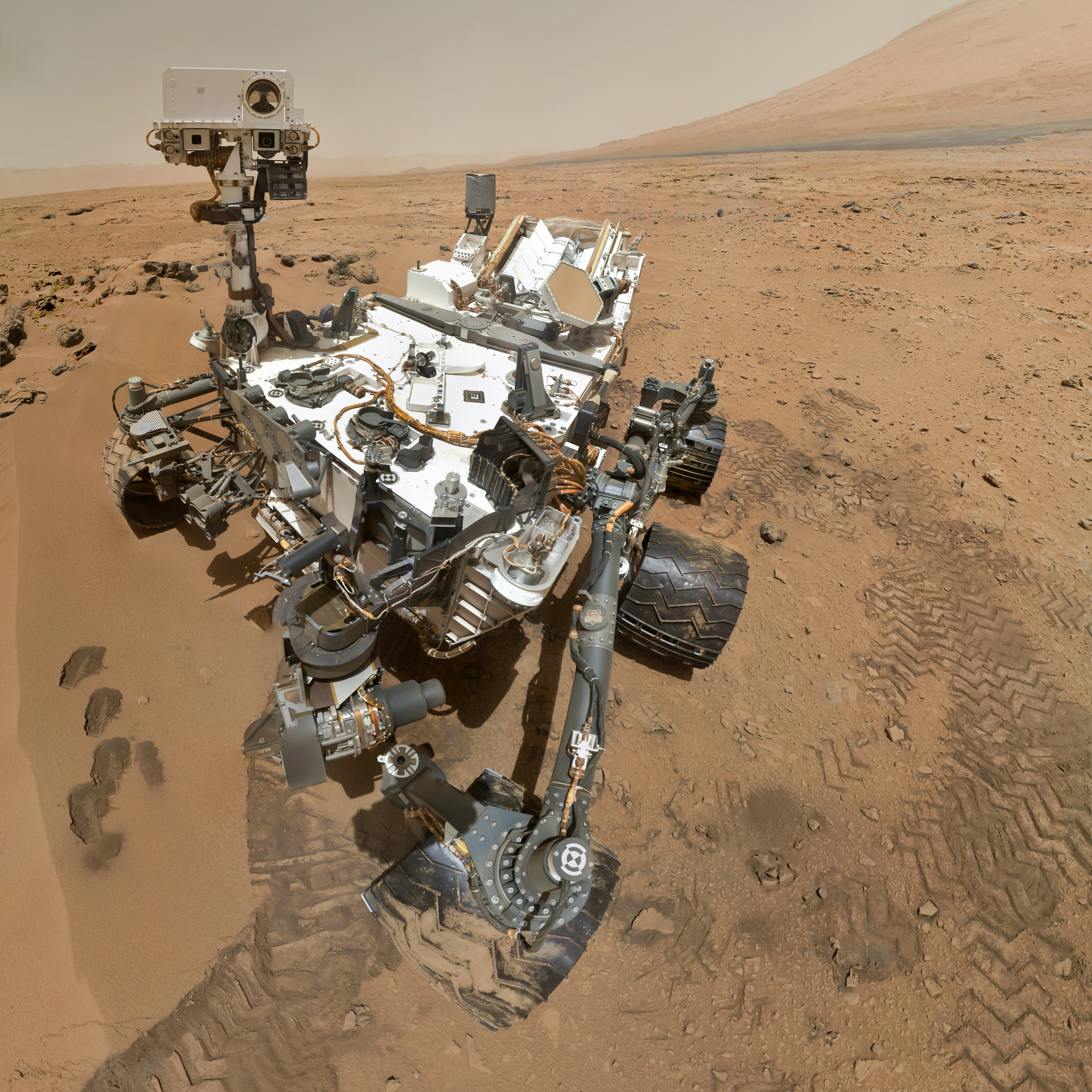
Self-portrait of Curiosity rover on Mars's surface, 2012

Space exploration is the physical investigation of outer space by uncrewed robotic space probes and through human spaceflight.

While the observation of objects in space, known as astronomy, predates reliable recorded history, it was the development of large and relatively efficient rockets during the mid-twentieth century that allowed physical space exploration to become a reality. Common rationales for exploring space include advancing scientific research, national prestige, uniting different countries, ensuring the future survival of humanity, and developing military and strategic advantages against other countries.

The early era of space exploration was driven by a "Space Race" in which the Soviet Union and the United States vied to demonstrate their technological superiority. Landmarks of this era include the launch of the first human-made object to orbit Earth, the Soviet Union's Sputnik 1, on 4 October 1957, and the first Moon landing by the American Apollo 11 mission on 20 July 1969. The Soviet space program achieved many of the first milestones, including the first living being in orbit in 1957, the first human spaceflight (Yuri Gagarin aboard Vostok 1) in 1961, the first spacewalk (by Alexei Leonov) on 18 March 1965, the first automatic landing on another celestial body in 1966, and the launch of the first space station (Salyut 1) in 1971.

In the 1970s, focus shifted from one-off flights to renewable hardware, such as the Space Shuttle program, and from competition to cooperation, the foremost example being the International Space Station (ISS), built between 1998 and 2011.

The 2000s brought advancements in the national space-exploration programs of China, the European Union, Japan, and India. The 2010s saw the rise of the private space industry in earnest with the development of private launch vehicles, space capsules, and satellite manufacturing. In the 2020s, the two primary global programs gaining traction are Moon-focused: the Chinese-led International Lunar Research Station and the U.S.-led Artemis program, with its plan to build the Artemis Base Camp on the Moon, each with a set of international partners.

== History of exploration ==
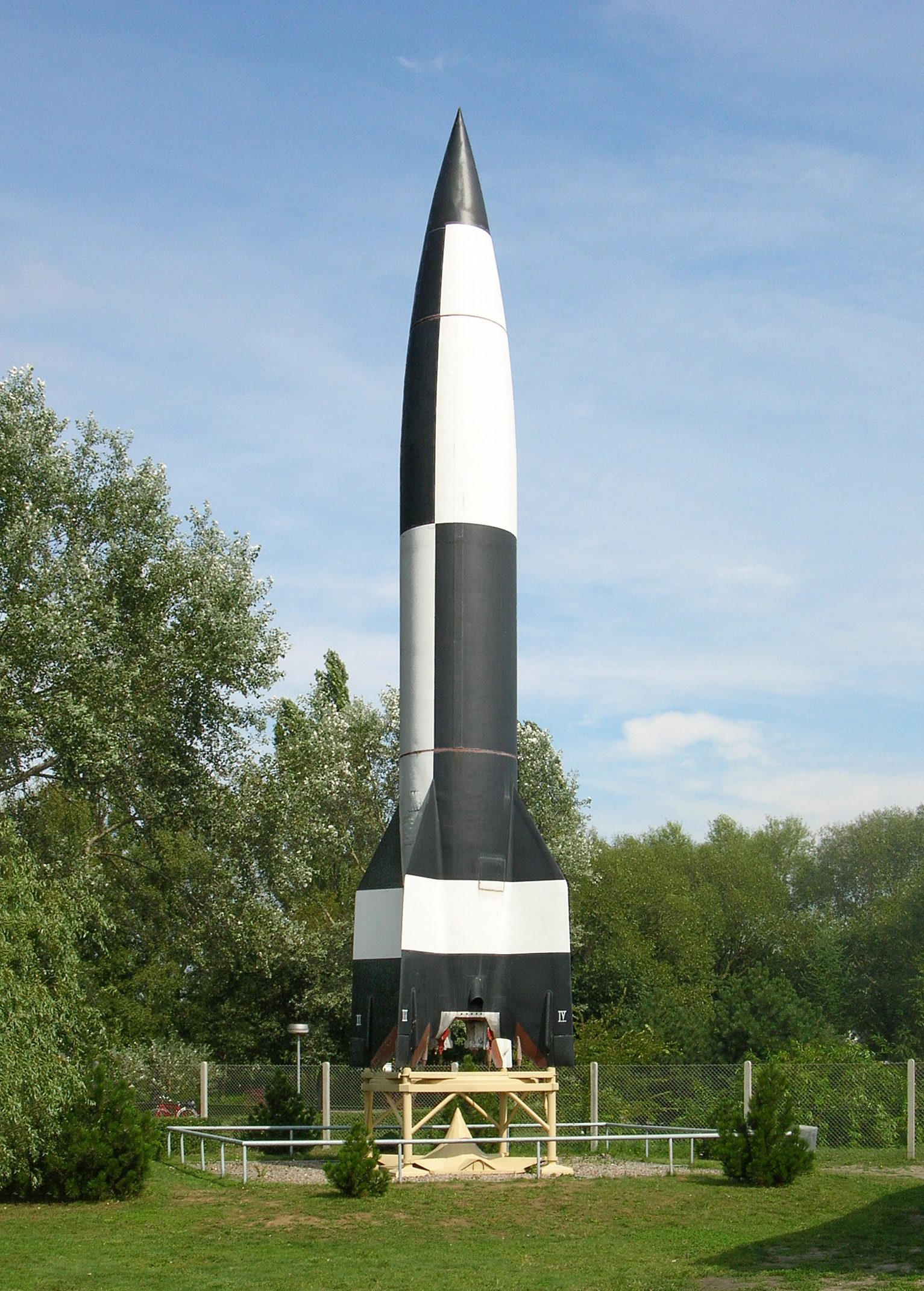
A V-2 Rocket in the Peenemünde Museum in Germany

=== First telescopes ===
The first telescope is said to have been invented in 1608 in the Netherlands by an eyeglass maker named Hans Lipperhey, but their first recorded use in astronomy was by Galileo Galilei in 1609. In 1668 Isaac Newton built his own reflecting telescope, the first fully functional telescope of this kind, and a landmark for future developments due to its superior features over the previous Galilean telescope.

A string of discoveries in the Solar System (and beyond) followed, then and in the next centuries: the mountains of the Moon, the phases of Venus, the main satellites of Jupiter and Saturn, the rings of Saturn, many comets, the asteroids, the new planets Uranus and Neptune, and many more satellites.

The Orbiting Astronomical Observatory 2 was the first space telescope launched 1968, but the launch of the Hubble Space Telescope in 1990 set a milestone. As of 1 December 2022, there were 5,284 confirmed exoplanets discovered. The Milky Way is estimated to contain 100–400 billion stars and more than 100 billion planets. There are at least 2 trillion galaxies in the observable universe. HD1 is the most distant known object from Earth, reported as 33.4 billion light-years away.

=== First outer space flights ===
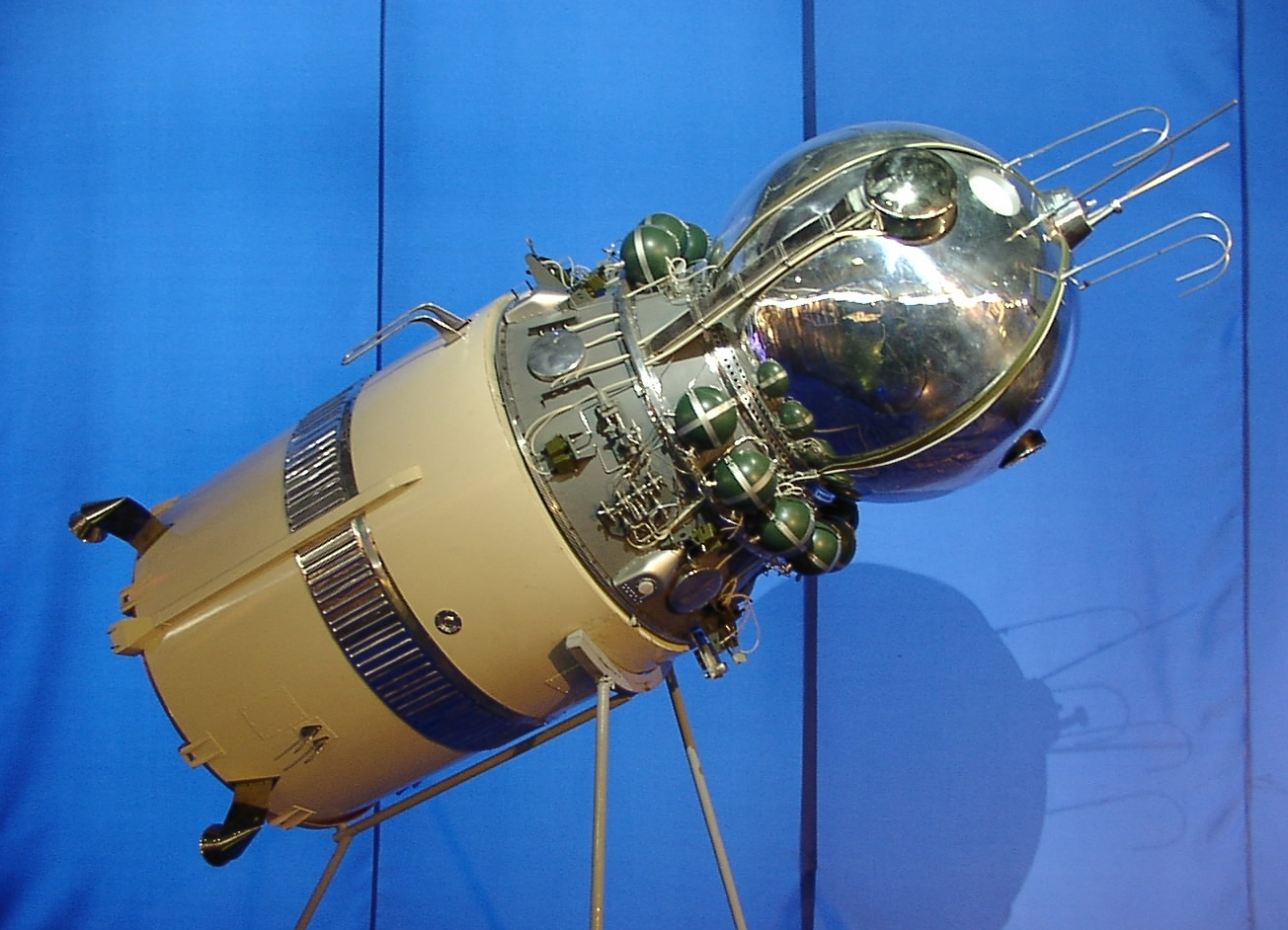
Model of a Russian Vostok spacecraft

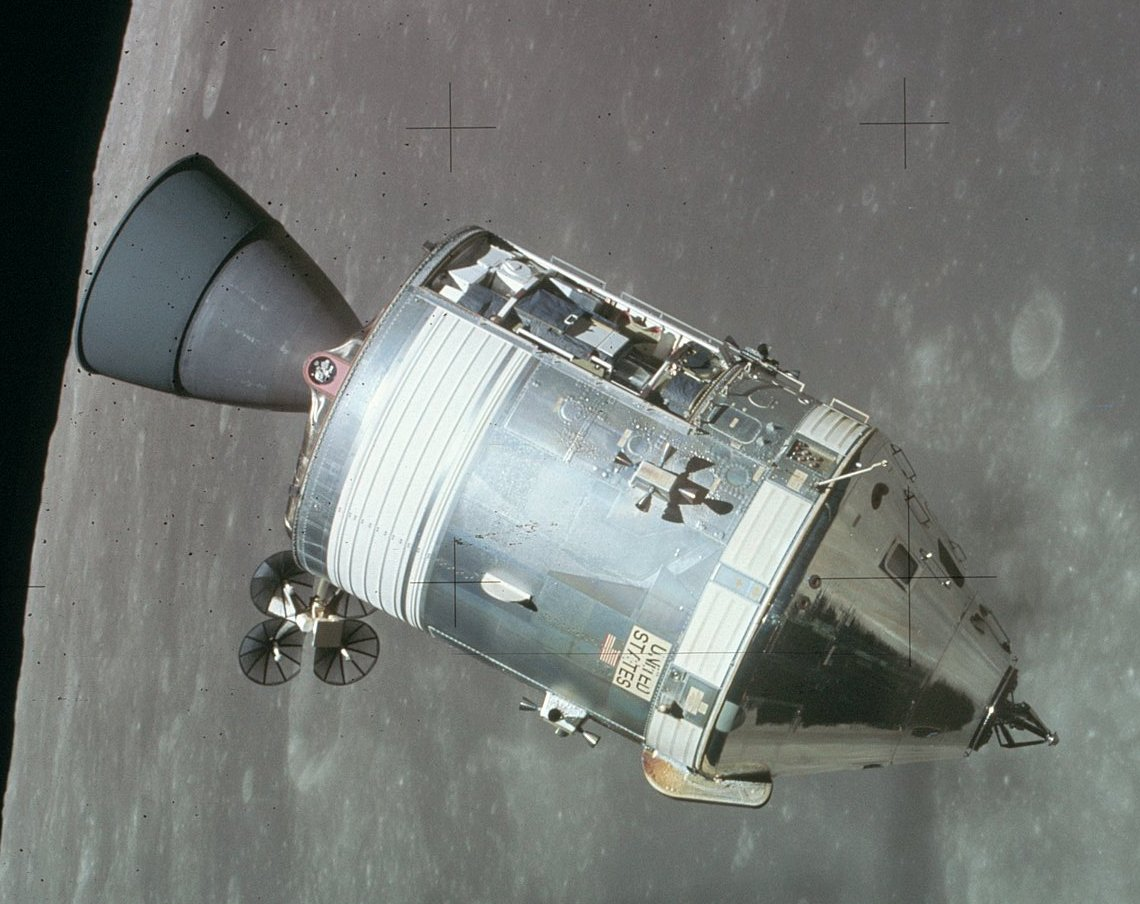
Apollo Command Service Module in lunar orbit

MW 18014 was a German V-2 rocket test launch that took place on 20 June 1944, at the Peenemünde Army Research Center in Peenemünde. It was the first human-made object to reach outer space, attaining an apogee of 176 kilometers, which is well above the Kármán line. It was a vertical test launch. Although the rocket reached space, it did not reach orbital velocity, and therefore returned to Earth in an impact, becoming the first sub-orbital spaceflight. In 1949, the Bumper-WAC reached an altitude of 393 kilometres (244 mi), becoming the first human-made object to enter space, according to NASA.

=== First object in orbit ===
The first successful orbital launch was of the Soviet uncrewed Sputnik 1 ("Satellite 1") mission on 4 October 1957. The satellite weighed about 83 kg (183 lb), and is believed to have orbited Earth at a height of about 250 km (160 mi). It had two radio transmitters (20 and 40 MHz), which emitted "beeps" that could be heard by radios around the globe. Analysis of the radio signals was used to gather information about the electron density of the ionosphere, while temperature and pressure data were encoded in the duration of radio beeps. The results indicated that the satellite was not punctured by a meteoroid. Sputnik 1 was launched by an R-7 rocket. It burned up upon re-entry on 3 January 1958.

=== First human outer space flight ===
The first successful human spaceflight was Vostok 1 ("East 1"), carrying the 27-year-old Russian cosmonaut, Yuri Gagarin, on 12 April 1961. The spacecraft completed one orbit around the globe, lasting about 1 hour and 48 minutes. Gagarin's flight resonated around the world; it was a demonstration of the advanced Soviet space program and it opened an entirely new era in space exploration: human spaceflight.

=== First astronomical body space explorations ===
The first artificial object to reach another celestial body was Luna 2 which reached the Moon in 1959. The first soft landing on another celestial body was performed by Luna 9 landing on the Moon on 3 February 1966. Luna 10 became the first artificial satellite of the Moon, entering in a lunar orbit on 3 April 1966.

The first crewed landing on another celestial body was performed by Apollo 11 on 20 July 1969, landing on the Moon. There have been a total of six spacecraft with humans landing on the Moon starting from 1969 to the last human landing in 1972.

The first interplanetary flyby was the 1961 Venera 1 flyby of Venus, though the 1962 Mariner 2 was the first flyby of Venus to return data (closest approach 34,773 kilometers). Pioneer 6 was the first satellite to orbit the Sun, launched on 16 December 1965. The other planets were first flown by in 1965 for Mars by Mariner 4, 1973 for Jupiter by Pioneer 10, 1974 for Mercury by Mariner 10, 1979 for Saturn by Pioneer 11, 1986 for Uranus by Voyager 2, 1989 for Neptune by Voyager 2. In 2015, the dwarf planets Ceres and Pluto were orbited by Dawn and passed by New Horizons, respectively. This accounts for flybys of each of the eight planets in the Solar System, the Sun, the Moon, and Ceres and Pluto (two of the five recognized dwarf planets).

The first interplanetary surface mission to return at least limited surface data from another planet was the 1970 landing of Venera 7, which returned data to Earth for 23 minutes from Venus. In 1975, Venera 9 was the first to return images from the surface of another planet, returning images from Venus. In 1971, the Mars 3 mission achieved the first soft landing on Mars returning data for almost 20 seconds. Later, much longer duration surface missions were achieved, including over six years of Mars surface operation by Viking 1 from 1975 to 1982 and over two hours of transmission from the surface of Venus by Venera 13 in 1982, the longest ever Soviet planetary surface mission. Venus and Mars are the two planets outside of Earth on which humans have conducted surface missions with uncrewed robotic spacecraft.

=== First space station ===
Salyut 1 was the first space station of any kind, launched into low Earth orbit by the Soviet Union on 19 April 1971. The International Space Station (ISS) is currently the largest and oldest of the 2 current fully functional space stations, inhabited continuously since the year 2000. The other, Tiangong space station built by China, is now fully crewed and operational.

=== First interstellar space flight ===
Voyager 1 became the first human-made object to leave the Solar System into interstellar space on 25 August 2012. The probe passed the heliopause at 121 AU to enter interstellar space.

=== Farthest from Earth ===
In 1970, Apollo 13 flight passed the far side of the Moon at an altitude of 254 kilometers (158 miles; 137 nautical miles) above the lunar surface, and 400,171 km (248,655 mi) from Earth, marking the record for the farthest humans had ever traveled from Earth until the Artemis II lunar flyby in April 2026, which was 406,773 km (252,757 mi) from Earth at its furthest point.

As of 9 February 2025, Voyager 1 was at a distance of 166.4 AU (24.89 billion km; 15.47 billion mi) from Earth. It is the most distant human-made object from Earth.

== Targets of exploration ==
Starting in the mid-20th century probes and then human missions were sent into Earth orbit, and then on to the Moon. Also, probes were sent throughout the known Solar System, and into Solar orbit. Uncrewed spacecraft have been sent into orbit around Saturn, Jupiter, Mars, Venus, and Mercury by the 21st century, and the most distance active spacecraft, Voyager 1 and 2 traveled beyond 100 times the Earth-Sun distance. The instruments were enough though that it is thought they have left the Sun's heliosphere, a sort of bubble of particles made in the Galaxy by the Sun's solar wind.

=== The Sun ===
The Sun is a major focus of space exploration. Being above the atmosphere in particular and Earth's magnetic field gives access to the solar wind and infrared and ultraviolet radiations that cannot reach Earth's surface. The Sun generates most space weather, which can affect power generation and transmission systems on Earth and interfere with, and even damage, satellites and space probes. Numerous spacecraft dedicated to observing the Sun, beginning with the Apollo Telescope Mount, have been launched and still others have had solar observation as a secondary objective. Parker Solar Probe, launched in 2018, will approach the Sun to within 1/9th the orbit of Mercury.

=== Mercury ===
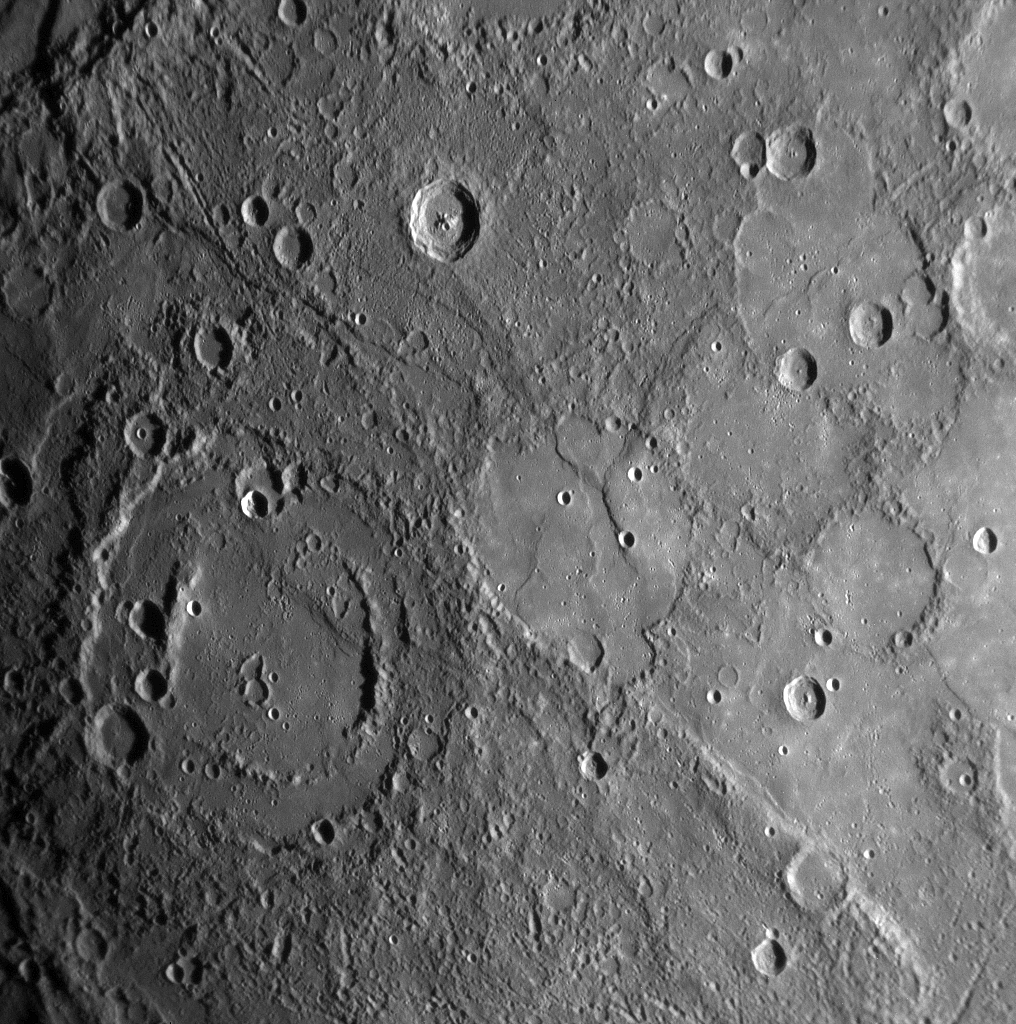
A MESSENGER image from 18,000 km showing a region about 500 km across (2008)

Mercury remains the least explored of the Terrestrial planets. As of May 2013, the Mariner 10 and MESSENGER missions have been the only missions that have made close observations of Mercury. MESSENGER entered orbit around Mercury in March 2011, to further investigate the observations made by Mariner 10 in 1975 (Munsell, 2006b). A third mission to Mercury, scheduled to arrive in 2025, BepiColombo is to include two probes. BepiColombo is a joint mission between Japan and the European Space Agency. MESSENGER and BepiColombo are intended to gather complementary data to help scientists understand many of the mysteries discovered by Mariner 10's flybys.

Flights to other planets within the Solar System are accomplished at a cost in energy, which is described by the net change in velocity of the spacecraft, or delta-v. Due to the relatively high delta-v to reach Mercury and its proximity to the Sun, it is difficult to explore and orbits around it are rather unstable.

=== Venus ===
Venus was the first target of interplanetary flyby and lander missions and, despite one of the most hostile surface environments in the Solar System, has had more landers sent to it (nearly all from the Soviet Union) than any other planet in the Solar System. The first flyby was the 1961 Venera 1, though the 1962 Mariner 2 was the first flyby to successfully return data. Mariner 2 has been followed by several other flybys by multiple space agencies often as part of missions using a Venus flyby to provide a gravitational assist en route to other celestial bodies. In 1967, Venera 4 became the first probe to enter and directly examine the atmosphere of Venus. In 1970, Venera 7 became the first successful lander to reach the surface of Venus and by 1985 it had been followed by eight additional successful Soviet Venus landers which provided images and other direct surface data. Starting in 1975, with the Soviet orbiter Venera 9, some ten successful orbiter missions have been sent to Venus, including later missions which were able to map the surface of Venus using radar to pierce the obscuring atmosphere.

=== Earth ===
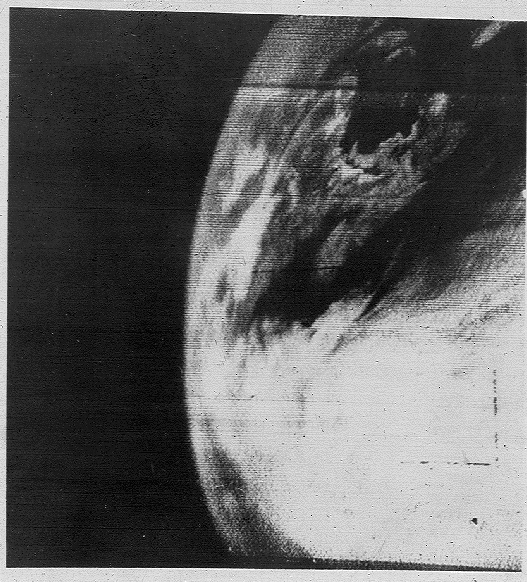
First television image of Earth from space, taken by TIROS-1 (1960)

Space exploration has been used as a tool to understand Earth as a celestial object. Orbital missions can provide data for Earth that can be difficult or impossible to obtain from a purely ground-based point of reference.

For example, the existence of the Van Allen radiation belts was unknown until their discovery by the United States' first artificial satellite, Explorer 1. These belts contain radiation trapped by Earth's magnetic fields, which currently renders construction of habitable space stations above 1000 km impractical. Following this early unexpected discovery, a large number of Earth observation satellites have been deployed specifically to explore Earth from a space-based perspective. These satellites have significantly contributed to the understanding of a variety of Earth-based phenomena. For instance, the hole in the ozone layer was found by an artificial satellite that was exploring Earth's atmosphere, and satellites have allowed for the discovery of archeological sites or geological formations that were difficult or impossible to otherwise identify.

==== The Moon ====
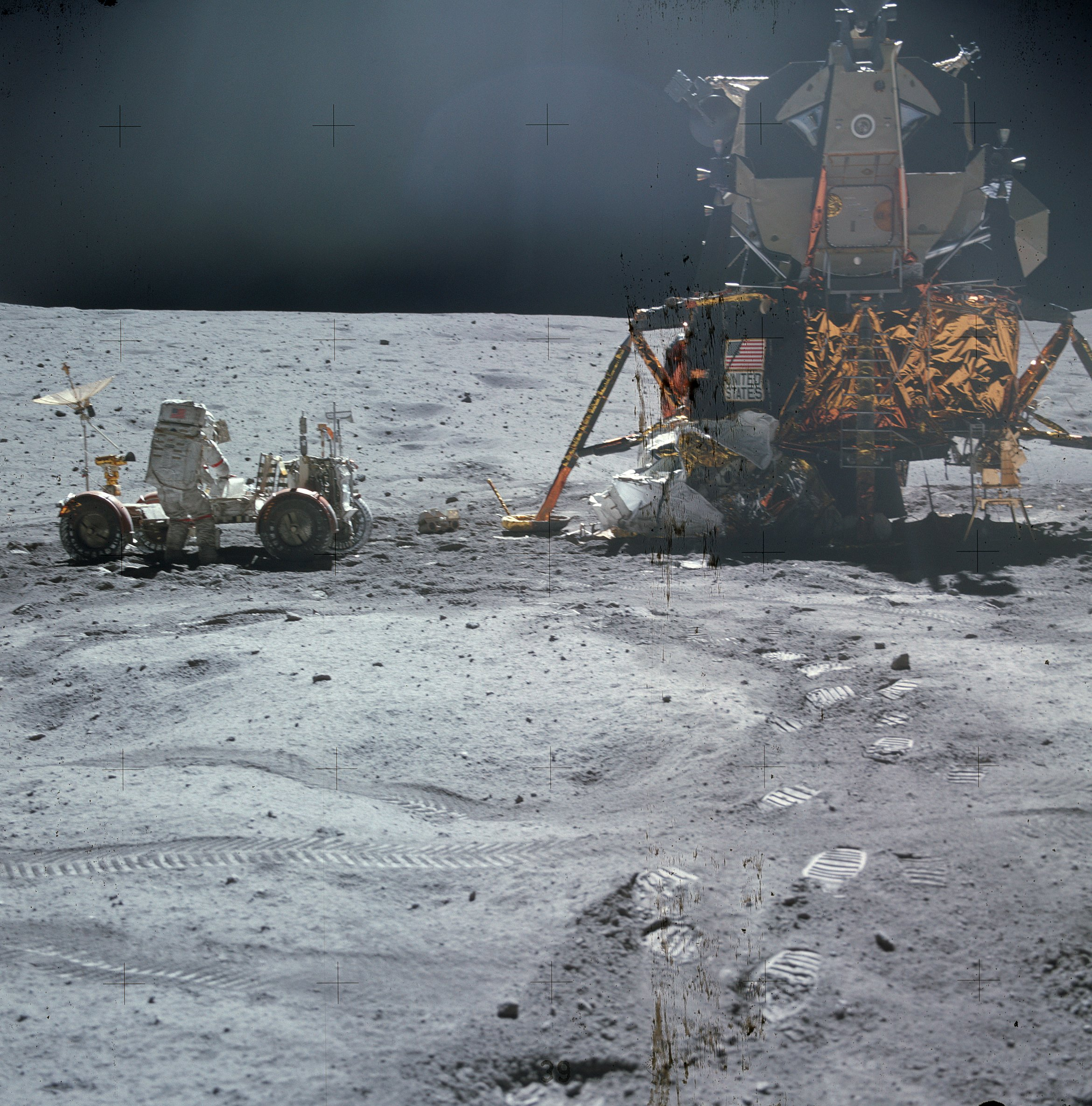
Apollo 16 LEM Orion, the Lunar Roving Vehicle and astronaut John Young (1972)

The Moon was the first celestial body to be the object of space exploration. It holds the distinctions of being the first remote celestial object to be flown by, orbited, and landed upon by spacecraft, and the only remote celestial object ever to be visited by humans.

In 1959, the Soviets obtained the first images of the far side of the Moon, never previously visible to humans. The U.S. exploration of the Moon began with the Ranger 4 impactor in 1962. Starting in 1966, the Soviets successfully deployed a number of landers to the Moon which were able to obtain data directly from the Moon's surface; just four months later, Surveyor 1 marked the debut of a successful series of U.S. landers. The Soviet uncrewed missions culminated in the Lunokhod program in the early 1970s, which included the first uncrewed rovers and also successfully brought lunar soil samples to Earth for study. This marked the first (and to date the only) automated return of extraterrestrial soil samples to Earth. Uncrewed exploration of the Moon continues with various nations periodically deploying lunar orbiters. China's Chang'e 4 in 2019 and Chang'e 6 in 2024 achieved the world's first landing and sample return on the far side of the Moon. India's Chandrayaan-3 in 2023 achieved the world's first landing on the lunar south pole region.

Crewed exploration of the Moon began in 1968 with the Apollo 8 mission that successfully orbited the Moon, the first time any extraterrestrial object was orbited by humans. In 1969, the Apollo 11 mission marked the first time humans set foot upon another world. Crewed exploration of the Moon did not continue for long. The Apollo 17 mission in 1972 marked the sixth landing and the most recent human visit. Artemis II completed a crewed flyby of the Moon in 2026, and Artemis IV, planned for 2028, will be the first lunar landing since Apollo 17. Robotic missions are still pursued vigorously.

=== Mars ===
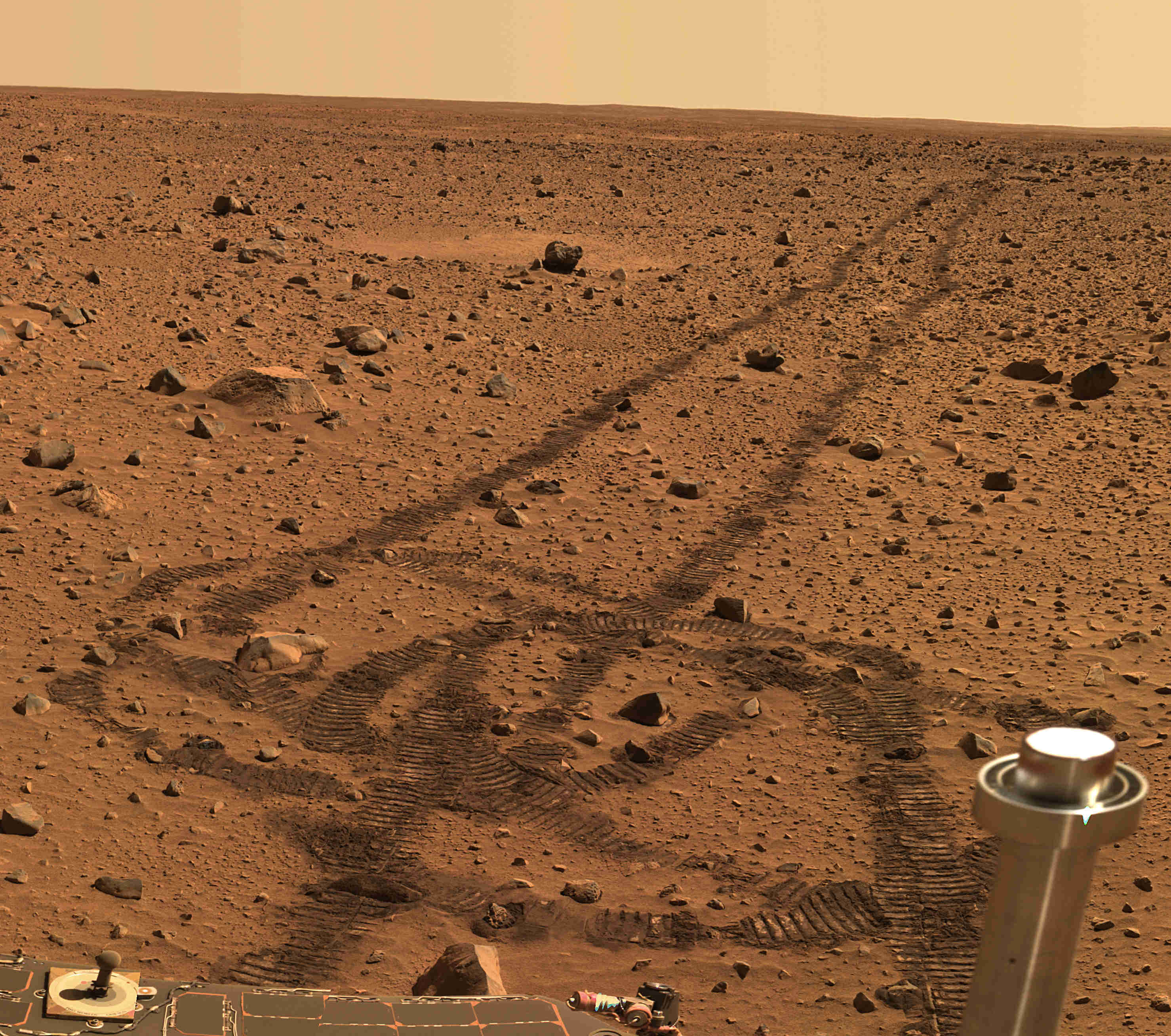
Surface of Mars by the Spirit rover (2004)

The exploration of Mars has been an important part of the space exploration programs of the Soviet Union (later Russia), the United States, Europe, Japan, and India. Dozens of robotic spacecraft, including orbiters, landers, and rovers, have been launched toward Mars since the 1960s. These missions were aimed at gathering data about current conditions and answering questions about the history of Mars. The questions raised by the scientific community are expected to not only give a better appreciation of the Red Planet but also yield further insight into the past, and possible future, of Earth.

The exploration of Mars has come at a considerable financial cost with roughly two-thirds of all spacecraft destined for Mars failing before completing their missions, with some failing before they even began. Such a high failure rate can be attributed to the complexity and large number of variables involved in an interplanetary journey, and has led researchers to jokingly speak of The Great Galactic Ghoul which subsists on a diet of Mars probes. This phenomenon is also informally known as the "Mars Curse". In contrast to overall high failure rates in the exploration of Mars, India has become the first country to achieve success of its maiden attempt. India's Mars Orbiter Mission (MOM) is one of the least expensive interplanetary missions ever undertaken with an approximate total cost of ₹ 450 Crore (US$73 million). The first mission to Mars by any Arab country has been taken up by the United Arab Emirates. Called the Emirates Mars Mission, it was launched on 19 July 2020 and went into orbit around Mars on 9 February 2021. The uncrewed exploratory probe was named "Hope Probe" and was sent to Mars to study its atmosphere in detail.

==== Phobos ====
The Russian space mission Fobos-Grunt, which launched on 9 November 2011, experienced a failure leaving it stranded in low Earth orbit. It was to begin exploration of the Phobos and Martian circumterrestrial orbit, and study whether the moons of Mars, or at least Phobos, could be a "trans-shipment point" for spaceships traveling to Mars.

=== Asteroids ===
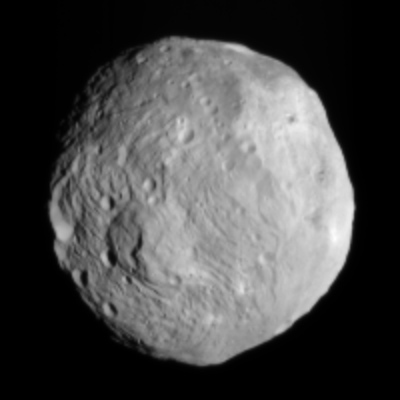
Asteroid 4 Vesta, imaged by the Dawn spacecraft (2011)

Until the advent of space travel, objects in the asteroid belt were merely pinpricks of light in even the largest telescopes, their shapes and terrain remaining a mystery. Several asteroids have now been visited by probes, the first of which was Galileo, which flew past two: 951 Gaspra in 1991, followed by 243 Ida in 1993. Both of these lay near enough to Galileo's planned trajectory to Jupiter that they could be visited at acceptable cost. The first landing on an asteroid was performed by the NEAR Shoemaker probe in 2000, following an orbital survey of the object, 433 Eros. The dwarf planet Ceres and the asteroid 4 Vesta, two of the three largest asteroids, were visited by NASA's Dawn spacecraft, launched in 2007.

Hayabusa was a robotic spacecraft developed by the Japan Aerospace Exploration Agency to return a sample of material from the small near-Earth asteroid 25143 Itokawa to Earth for further analysis. Hayabusa was launched on 9 May 2003 and rendezvoused with Itokawa in mid-September 2005. After arriving at Itokawa, Hayabusa studied the asteroid's shape, spin, topography, color, composition, density, and history. In November 2005, it landed on the asteroid twice to collect samples. The spacecraft returned to Earth on 13 June 2010.

=== Jupiter ===
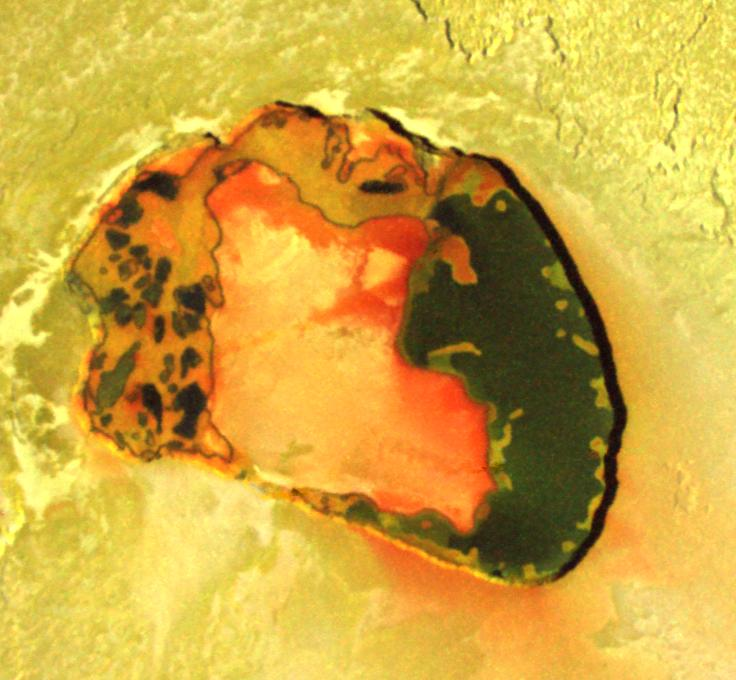
Tupan Patera on Jupiter's moon Io

The exploration of Jupiter has consisted solely of a number of automated NASA spacecraft visiting the planet since 1973. A large majority of the missions have been "flybys", in which detailed observations are taken without the probe landing or entering orbit; such as in Pioneer and Voyager programs. The Galileo and Juno spacecraft are the only spacecraft to have entered the planet's orbit. As Jupiter is believed to have only a relatively small rocky core and no real solid surface, a landing mission is precluded.

Reaching Jupiter from Earth requires a delta-v of 9.2 km/s, which is comparable to the 9.7 km/s delta-v needed to reach low Earth orbit. Fortunately, gravity assists through planetary flybys can be used to reduce the energy required at launch to reach Jupiter, albeit at the cost of a significantly longer flight duration.

Jupiter has 95 known moons, many of which have relatively little known information about them.

=== Saturn ===
Saturn has been explored only through uncrewed spacecraft launched by NASA, including one mission (Cassini–Huygens) planned and executed in cooperation with other space agencies. These missions consist of flybys in 1979 by Pioneer 11, in 1980 by Voyager 1, in 1982 by Voyager 2 and an orbital mission by the Cassini spacecraft, which lasted from 2004 until 2017.

Saturn has at least 62 known moons, although the exact number is debatable since Saturn's rings are made up of vast numbers of independently orbiting objects of varying sizes. The largest of the moons is Titan, which holds the distinction of being the only moon in the Solar System with an atmosphere denser and thicker than that of Earth. Titan holds the distinction of being the only object in the Outer Solar System that has been explored with a lander, the Huygens probe deployed by the Cassini spacecraft.

=== Uranus ===
The exploration of Uranus has been entirely through the Voyager 2 spacecraft. However, there are plans for the Chinese Tianwen 4 mission to visit it or Callisto. Given its axial tilt of 97.77°, with its polar regions exposed to sunlight or darkness for long periods, scientists were not sure what to expect at Uranus. The closest approach to Uranus occurred on 24 January 1986. Voyager 2 studied the planet's unique atmosphere and magnetosphere. Voyager 2 also examined its ring system and the moons of Uranus including all five of the previously known moons, while discovering an additional ten previously unknown moons.

Images of Uranus proved to have a uniform appearance, with no evidence of the dramatic storms or atmospheric banding evident on Jupiter and Saturn. Great effort was required to even identify a few clouds in the images of the planet. The magnetosphere of Uranus, however, proved to be unique, being profoundly affected by the planet's unusual axial tilt. In contrast to the bland appearance of Uranus itself, striking images were obtained of the Moons of Uranus, including evidence that Miranda had been unusually geologically active.

=== Neptune ===
The exploration of Neptune began with the 25 August 1989 Voyager 2 flyby, the sole visit to the system. The possibility of a Neptune Orbiter has been discussed, but no other missions have been given serious thought.

Although the extremely uniform appearance of Uranus during Voyager 2's visit in 1986 had led to expectations that Neptune would also have few visible atmospheric phenomena, the spacecraft found that Neptune had obvious banding, visible clouds, auroras, and even a conspicuous anticyclone storm system rivaled in size only by Jupiter's Great Red Spot. Neptune also proved to have the fastest winds of any planet in the Solar System, measured as high as 2,100 km/h. Voyager 2 also examined Neptune's ring and moon system. It discovered 900 complete rings and additional partial ring "arcs" around Neptune. In addition to examining Neptune's three previously known moons, Voyager 2 also discovered five previously unknown moons, one of which, Proteus, proved to be the last largest moon in the system. Data from Voyager 2 supported the view that Neptune's largest moon, Triton, is a captured Kuiper belt object.

=== Pluto ===
The dwarf planet Pluto presents significant challenges for spacecraft because of its great distance from Earth (requiring high velocity for reasonable trip times) and small mass (making capture into orbit difficult at present). Voyager 1 could have visited Pluto, but controllers opted instead for a close flyby of Saturn's moon Titan, resulting in a trajectory incompatible with a Pluto flyby. Voyager 2 never had a plausible trajectory for reaching Pluto.

After an intense political battle, a mission to Pluto dubbed New Horizons was granted funding from the United States government in 2003. New Horizons was launched successfully on 19 January 2006. In early 2007 the craft made use of a gravity assist from Jupiter. Its closest approach to Pluto was on 14 July 2015; scientific observations of Pluto began five months prior to closest approach and continued for 16 days after the encounter.

=== Kuiper Belt Objects ===
The New Horizons mission also performed a flyby of the small planetesimal Arrokoth, in the Kuiper belt, in 2019. This was its first extended mission.

=== Comets ===
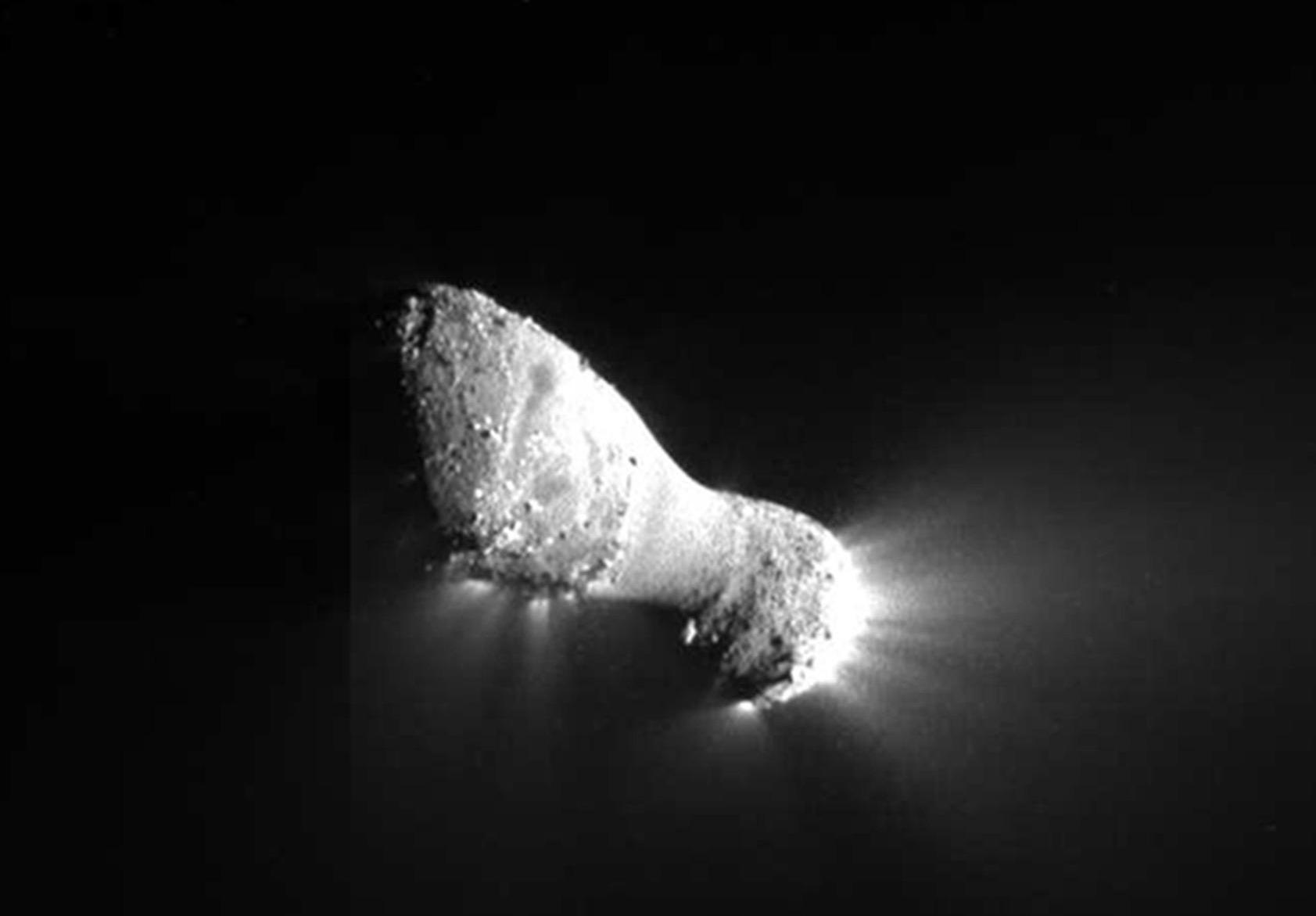
Comet 103P/Hartley (2010)

Although many comets have been studied from Earth sometimes with centuries-worth of observations, only a few comets have been closely visited. In 1985, the International Cometary Explorer conducted the first comet fly-by (21P/Giacobini-Zinner) before joining the Halley Armada studying the famous comet. The Deep Impact probe smashed into 9P/Tempel to learn more about its structure and composition and the Stardust mission returned samples of another comet's tail. The Philae lander successfully landed on Comet Churyumov–Gerasimenko in 2014 as part of the broader Rosetta mission.

=== Deep space exploration ===
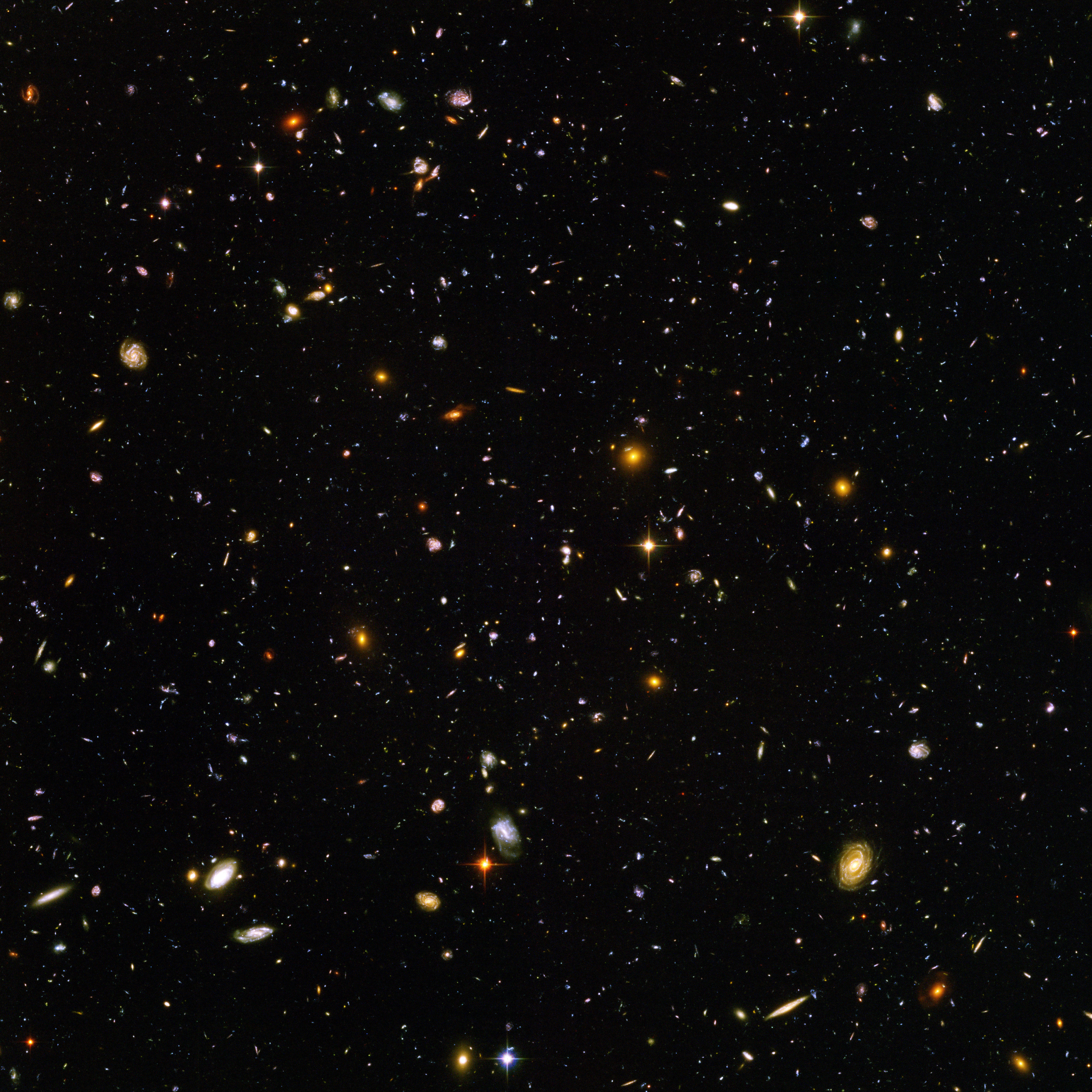
This high-resolution image of the Hubble Ultra Deep Field includes galaxies of various ages, sizes, shapes, and colors. The smallest, reddest galaxies, are some of the most distant galaxies to have been imaged by an optical telescope.

Deep space exploration is the branch of astronomy, astronautics and space technology that is involved with the exploration of distant regions of outer space. Physical exploration of space is conducted both by human spaceflights (deep-space astronautics) and by robotic spacecraft.

Some of the best candidates for future deep space engine technologies include anti-matter, nuclear power and beamed propulsion. Beamed propulsion, appears to be the best candidate for deep space exploration presently available, since it uses known physics and known technology that is being developed for other purposes.

== Future of space exploration ==
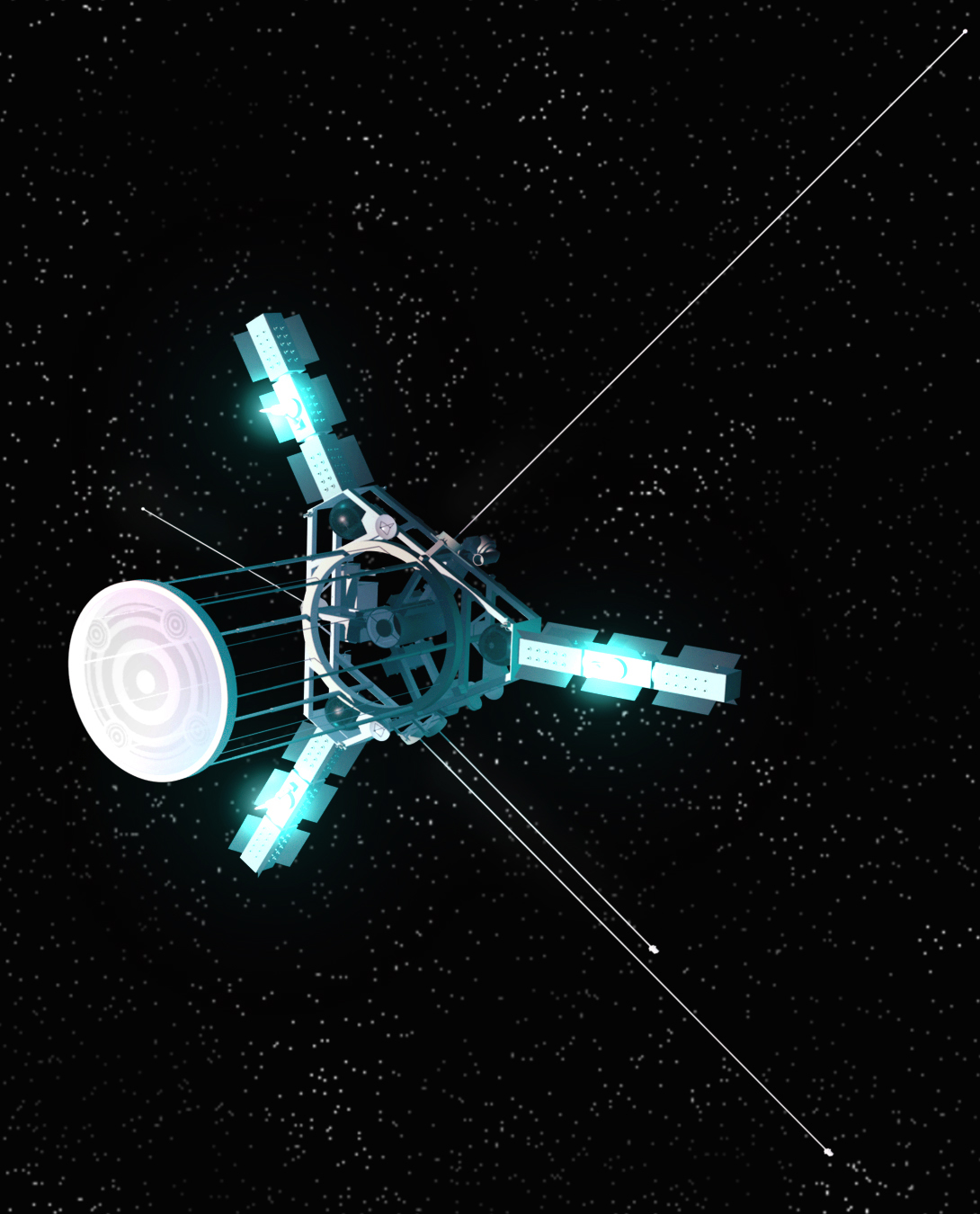
Concept art for a NASA Vision mission

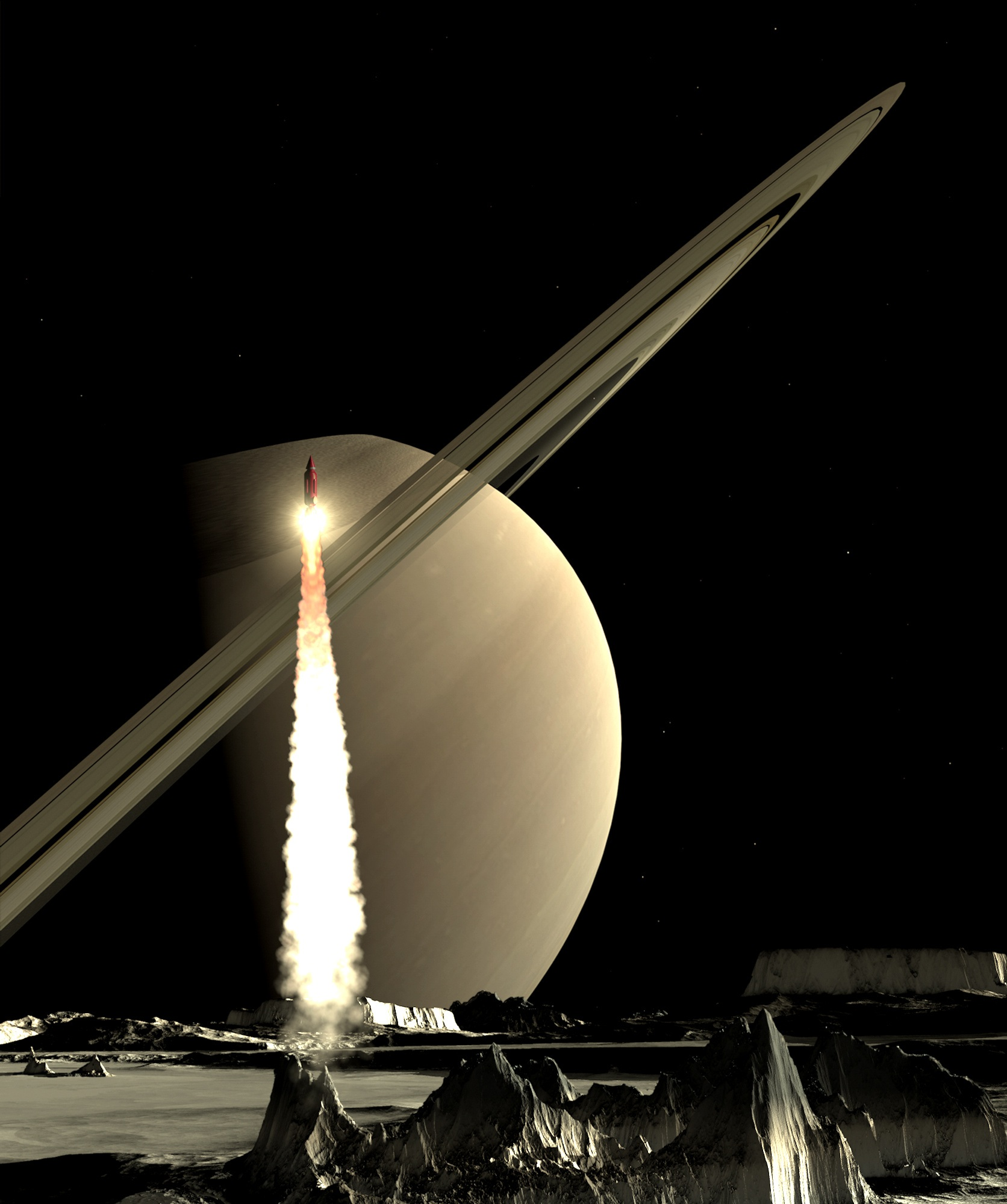
Artistic image of a rocket lifting from a Saturn moon

=== Breakthrough Starshot ===
Breakthrough Starshot is a research and engineering project by the Breakthrough Initiatives to develop a proof-of-concept fleet of light sail spacecraft named StarChip, to be capable of making the journey to the Alpha Centauri star system 4.37 light-years away. It was founded in 2016 by Yuri Milner, Stephen Hawking, and Mark Zuckerberg.

=== Asteroids ===
An article in the science magazine Nature suggested the use of asteroids as a gateway for space exploration, with the ultimate destination being Mars. In order to make such an approach viable, three requirements need to be fulfilled: first, "a thorough asteroid survey to find thousands of nearby bodies suitable for astronauts to visit"; second, "extending flight duration and distance capability to ever-increasing ranges out to Mars"; and finally, "developing better robotic vehicles and tools to enable astronauts to explore an asteroid regardless of its size, shape or spin". Furthermore, using asteroids would provide astronauts with protection from galactic cosmic rays, with mission crews being able to land on them without great risk to radiation exposure.

=== Artemis program ===
The Artemis program is an ongoing crewed spaceflight program carried out by NASA, U.S. commercial spaceflight companies, and international partners such as ESA, with the goal of landing "the first woman and the next man" on the Moon, specifically at the lunar south pole region. Artemis would be the next step towards the long-term goal of establishing a sustainable presence on the Moon, laying the foundation for private companies to build a lunar economy, and eventually sending humans to Mars.

In 2017, the lunar campaign was authorized by Space Policy Directive 1, using various ongoing spacecraft programs such as Orion, the Lunar Gateway, Commercial Lunar Payload Services, and adding an undeveloped crewed lander. The Space Launch System will serve as the primary launch vehicle for Orion, while commercial launch vehicles are planned for use to launch other elements of the campaign. NASA requested $1.6 billion in additional funding for Artemis for fiscal year 2020, while the U.S. Senate Appropriations Committee requested from NASA a five-year budget profile which is needed for evaluation and approval by the U.S. Congress. As of 2026, the first Artemis mission was launched in 2022 with the second mission, a crewed lunar flyby launched in April 2026. Construction on the Lunar Gateway is underway with initial capabilities set for the 2025–2027 timeframe. The first CLPS lander landed in 2024, marking the first US spacecraft to land since Apollo 17.

== Rationales ==
Astronaut Buzz Aldrin had a personal Communion service when he first arrived on the surface of the Moon.

The research that is conducted by national space exploration agencies, such as NASA and Roscosmos, is one of the reasons supporters cite to justify government expenses. Economic analyses of the NASA programs often showed ongoing economic benefits (such as NASA spin-offs), generating many times the revenue of the cost of the program. It is also argued that space exploration would lead to the extraction of resources on other planets and especially asteroids, which contain billions of dollars' worth of minerals and metals. Such expeditions could generate substantial revenue. In addition, it has been argued that space exploration programs help inspire youth to study in science and engineering. Space exploration also gives scientists the ability to perform experiments in other settings and expand humanity's knowledge.

Another claim is that space exploration is a necessity to humankind and that staying on Earth will eventually lead to extinction. Some of the reasons are lack of natural resources, comets, nuclear war, and worldwide epidemic. Stephen Hawking, renowned British theoretical physicist, said, "I don't think the human race will survive the next thousand years, unless we spread into space. There are too many accidents that can befall life on a single planet. But I'm an optimist. We will reach out to the stars." Author Arthur C. Clarke (1950) presented a summary of motivations for the human exploration of space in his non-fiction semi-technical monograph Interplanetary Flight. He argued that humanity's choice is essentially between expansion off Earth into space, versus cultural (and eventually biological) stagnation and death.

These motivations could be attributed to one of the first rocket scientists in NASA, Wernher von Braun, and his vision of humans moving beyond Earth. The basis of this plan was to:

Develop multi-stage rockets capable of placing satellites, animals, and humans in space.

Development of large, winged reusable spacecraft capable of carrying humans and equipment into Earth orbit in a way that made space access routine and cost-effective.

Construction of a large, permanently occupied space station to be used as a platform both to observe Earth and from which to launch deep space expeditions.

Launching the first human flights around the Moon, leading to the first landings of humans on the Moon, with the intent of exploring that body and establishing permanent lunar bases.

Assembly and fueling of spaceships in Earth orbit for the purpose of sending humans to Mars with the intent of eventually colonizing that planet.

Known as the Von Braun Paradigm, the plan was formulated to lead humans in the exploration of space. Von Braun's vision of human space exploration served as the model for efforts in space exploration well into the twenty-first century, with NASA incorporating this approach into the majority of their projects. The steps were followed out of order, as seen by the Apollo program reaching the moon before the space shuttle program was started, which in turn was used to complete the International Space Station. Von Braun's Paradigm formed NASA's drive for human exploration, in the hopes that humans discover the far reaches of the universe.

NASA has produced a series of public service announcement videos supporting the concept of space exploration.

Overall, the U.S. public remains largely supportive of both crewed and uncrewed space exploration. According to an Associated Press Poll conducted in July 2003, 71% of U.S. citizens agreed with the statement that the space program is "a good investment", compared to 21% who did not.

=== Human nature ===
Space advocacy and space policy regularly invokes exploration as a human nature.

== Topics ==
=== Spaceflight ===
Delta-v's in km/s for various orbital maneuvers

Spaceflight is the use of space technology to achieve the flight of spacecraft into and through outer space.

Spaceflight is used in space exploration, and also in commercial activities like space tourism and satellite telecommunications. Additional non-commercial uses of spaceflight include space observatories, reconnaissance satellites and other Earth observation satellites.

A spaceflight typically begins with a rocket launch, which provides the initial thrust to overcome the force of gravity and propels the spacecraft from the surface of Earth. Once in space, the motion of a spacecraft—both when unpropelled and when under propulsion—is covered by the area of study called astrodynamics. Some spacecraft remain in space indefinitely, some disintegrate during atmospheric reentry, and others reach a planetary or lunar surface for landing or impact.

=== Satellites ===
Satellites are used for a large number of purposes. Common types include military (spy) and civilian Earth observation satellites, communication satellites, navigation satellites, weather satellites, and research satellites. Space stations and human spacecraft in orbit are also satellites.

=== Commercialization of space ===
The commercialization of space first started out with the launching of private satellites by NASA or other space agencies. Current examples of the commercial satellite use of space include satellite navigation systems, satellite television, satellite communications (such as internet services) and satellite radio. The next step of commercialization of space was seen as human spaceflight. Flying humans safely to and from space had become routine to NASA and Russia. Reusable spacecraft were an entirely new engineering challenge, something only seen in novels and films like Star Trek and War of the Worlds. Astronaut Buzz Aldrin supported the use of making a reusable vehicle like the space shuttle. Aldrin held that reusable spacecraft were the key in making space travel affordable, stating that the use of "passenger space travel is a huge potential market big enough to justify the creation of reusable launch vehicles". Space tourism is a next step in the use of reusable vehicles in the commercialization of space. The purpose of this form of space travel is personal pleasure.

Private spaceflight companies such as SpaceX and Blue Origin, and commercial space stations such as the Axiom Space and the Bigelow Commercial Space Station have changed the cost and overall landscape of space exploration, and are expected to continue to do so in the near future.

=== Alien life ===
Astrobiology is the interdisciplinary study of life in the universe, combining aspects of astronomy, biology and geology. It is focused primarily on the study of the origin, distribution and evolution of life. It is also known as exobiology (from Greek: έξω, exo, "outside"). The term "Xenobiology" has been used as well, but this is technically incorrect because its terminology means "biology of the foreigners". Astrobiologists must also consider the possibility of life that is chemically entirely distinct from any life found on Earth. In the Solar System, some of the prime locations for current or past astrobiology are on Enceladus, Europa, Mars, and Titan.

=== Human spaceflight and habitation ===
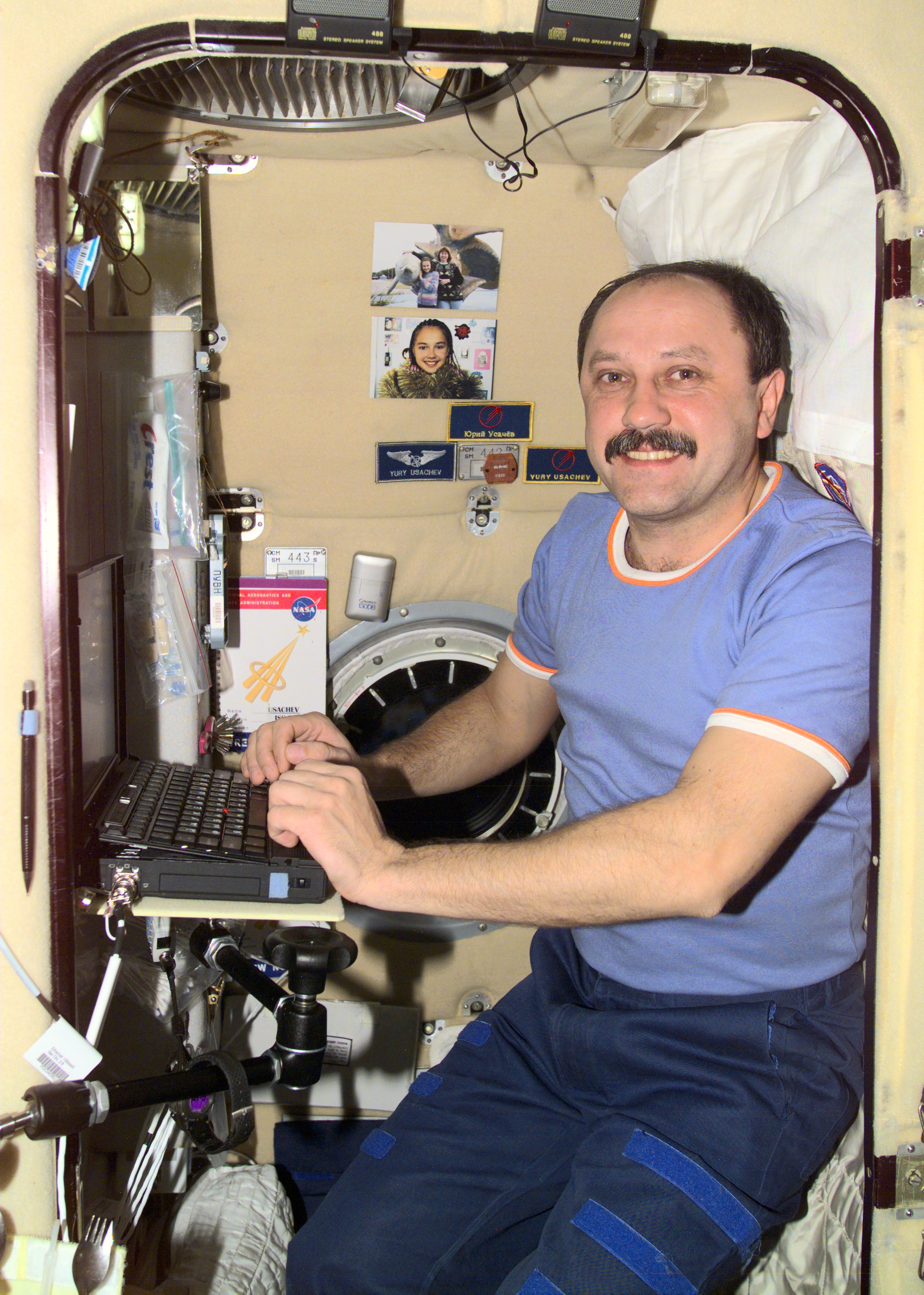
Crew quarters on Zvezda, the base ISS crew module

To date, the longest human occupation of space is the International Space Station which has been in continuous use for 26 years, 16 days. Valeri Polyakov's record single spaceflight of almost 438 days aboard the Mir space station has not been surpassed. The health effects of space have been well documented through years of research conducted in the field of aerospace medicine. Analog environments similar to those experienced in space travel (like deep sea submarines), have been used in this research to further explore the relationship between isolation and extreme environments. It is imperative that the health of the crew be maintained as any deviation from baseline may compromise the integrity of the mission as well as the safety of the crew, hence the astronauts must endure rigorous medical screenings and tests prior to embarking on any missions. However, it does not take long for the environmental dynamics of spaceflight to commence its toll on the human body; for example, space motion sickness (SMS) – a condition which affects the neurovestibular system and culminates in mild to severe signs and symptoms such as vertigo, dizziness, fatigue, nausea, and disorientation – plagues almost all space travelers within their first few days in orbit. Space travel can also have an impact on the psyche of the crew members as delineated in anecdotal writings composed after their retirement. Space travel can adversely affect the body's natural biological clock (circadian rhythm); sleep patterns causing sleep deprivation and fatigue; and social interaction; consequently, residing in a Low Earth Orbit (LEO) environment for a prolonged amount of time can result in both mental and physical exhaustion. Long-term stays in space reveal issues with bone and muscle loss in low gravity, immune system suppression, problems with eyesight, and radiation exposure. The lack of gravity causes fluid to rise upward which can cause pressure to build up in the eye, resulting in vision problems; the loss of bone minerals and densities; cardiovascular deconditioning; and decreased endurance and muscle mass.

Radiation is an insidious health hazard to space travelers as it is invisible and can cause cancer. When above the Earth's magnetic field, spacecraft are no longer protected from the sun's radiation; the danger of radiation is even more potent in deep space. The hazards of radiation can be ameliorated through protective shielding on the spacecraft, alerts, and dosimetry.

Fortunately, with new and rapidly evolving technological advancements, those in Mission Control are able to monitor the health of their astronauts more closely using telemedicine. One may not be able to completely evade the physiological effects of space flight, but those effects can be mitigated. For example, medical systems aboard space vessels such as the International Space Station (ISS) are well equipped and designed to counteract the effects of lack of gravity and weightlessness; on-board treadmills can help prevent muscle loss and reduce the risk of developing premature osteoporosis. Additionally, a crew medical officer is appointed for each ISS mission and a flight surgeon is available 24/7 via the ISS Mission Control Center located in Houston, Texas. Although the interactions are intended to take place in real time, communications between the space and terrestrial crew may become delayed – sometimes by as much as 20 minutes – as their distance from each other increases when the spacecraft moves further out of low Earth orbit; because of this the crew are trained and need to be prepared to respond to any medical emergencies that may arise on the vessel as the ground crew are hundreds of miles away.

Many past and current concepts for the continued exploration and colonization of space focus on a return to the Moon as a "steppingstone" to the other planets, especially Mars. At the end of 2006, NASA announced they were planning to build a permanent Moon base with continual presence by 2024.

Beyond the technical factors that could make living in space more widespread, it has been suggested that the lack of private property, the inability or difficulty in establishing property rights in space, has been an impediment to the development of space for human habitation. Since the advent of space technology in the latter half of the twentieth century, the ownership of property in space has been murky, with strong arguments both for and against. In particular, the making of national territorial claims in outer space and on celestial bodies has been specifically proscribed by the Outer Space Treaty, which had been, as of 2012, ratified by all spacefaring nations. Space colonization, also called space settlement and space humanization, would be the permanent autonomous (self-sufficient) human habitation of locations outside Earth, especially of natural satellites or planets such as the Moon or Mars, using significant amounts of in-situ resource utilization.

==== Human representation and participation ====
Participation and representation of humanity in space is an issue ever since the first phase of space exploration. Some rights of non-spacefaring countries have been mostly secured through international space law, declaring space the "province of all mankind", understanding spaceflight as its resource, though sharing of space for all humanity is still criticized as imperialist and lacking. Additionally to international inclusion, the inclusion of women and people of colour has also been lacking. To reach a more inclusive spaceflight, some organizations like the Justspace Alliance and IAU featured Inclusive Astronomy have been formed in recent years.

===== Women =====
The first woman to go to space was Valentina Tereshkova. She flew in 1963 but it was not until the 1980s that another woman entered space again. All astronauts were required to be military test pilots at the time and women were not able to join this career. This is one reason for the delay in allowing women to join space crews. After the rule changed, Svetlana Savitskaya became the second woman to go to space, she was also from the Soviet Union. Sally Ride became the next woman in space and the first woman to fly to space through the United States program.

Since then, eleven other countries have allowed women astronauts. The first all-female space walk occurred in 2018, including Christina Koch and Jessica Meir. They had both previously participated in space walks with NASA. The first woman to go to the Moon is planned for 2026.

Despite these developments, women are underrepresented among astronauts and especially cosmonauts. Issues that block potential applicants from the programs, and limit the space missions they are able to go on, include:

- agencies limiting women to half as much time in space than men, arguing that there may be unresearched additional risks for cancer.
- a lack of space suits sized appropriately for female astronauts.

=== Art ===
Artistry in and from space ranges from signals, capturing and arranging material like Yuri Gagarin's selfie in space or the image The Blue Marble, over drawings like the first one in space by cosmonaut and artist Alexei Leonov, music videos like Chris Hadfield's cover of Space Oddity on board the ISS, to permanent installations on celestial bodies like on the Moon.

=== Public perception and media depictions ===
Media depictions of space exploration tend to be largely positive whether they be science fiction or not such as with Star Trek or through space news stories.

==== In the United States ====
In the United States the public is largely supportive of NASA which coordinates the country's space program as a whole including exploration. A 2026 YouGov survey of US adults found that when asked which should be a higher priority for exploration: the Moon, Mars, both, neither and not sure; most said the greatest priority should be put toward exploring both equally.

==== Europe ====
In a poll taken of several European countries by toulana and Harris interactive for the European Space Agency reported that most had a positive view of space exploration in each country surveyed.

== See also ==
- Discovery and exploration of the Solar System
- Spacecraft propulsion
- List of crewed spacecraft
- List of missions to Mars
- List of missions to the outer planets
- List of landings on extraterrestrial bodies
- List of spaceflight records

=== Robotic space exploration programs ===
- Robotic spacecraft
- Timeline of planetary exploration
- Landings on other planets
- Pioneer program
- Luna program
- Zond program
- Venera program
- Mars probe program
- Ranger program
- Mariner program
- Surveyor program
- Viking program
- Voyager program
- Vega program
- Phobos program
- Discovery program
- Chandrayaan Program
- Mangalyaan Program
- Chang'e Program
- Private Astrobotic Technology Program

=== Living in space ===
- Interplanetary contamination

==== Animals in space ====
- Animals in space
- Monkeys in space
- Russian space dogs

==== Humans in space ====
- Astronauts
- List of human spaceflights
- List of human spaceflights by program
- Vostok program
- Mercury program
- Voskhod program
- Gemini program
- Soyuz program
- Apollo program
- Salyut program
- Skylab
- Space Shuttle program
- Mir
- International Space Station
- Vision for Space Exploration
- Aurora Programme
- Tier One
- Effect of spaceflight on the human body
- Space architecture
- Research station – Facility for scientific research
- Space observatory – Instrument in space to study astronomical objects
- Space archaeology
- flexible path destinations set

=== Recent and future developments ===
- Commercial astronauts
- Artemis program
- Energy development
- Exploration of Mars
- Space tourism
- Private spaceflight
- Space colonization
- Interstellar spaceflight
- Deep space exploration
- Human outpost
- Mars to Stay
- NewSpace
- NASA lunar outpost concepts

=== Other ===
- List of spaceflights
- Timeline of Solar System exploration
- List of artificial objects on extra-terrestrial surfaces
- Space station
- Space telescope
- Sample return mission
- Atmospheric reentry
- Space and survival
- List of spaceflight-related accidents and incidents
- Religion in space
- Militarisation of space
- French space program
- Russian explorers
- U.S. space exploration history on U.S. stamps
- Deep-sea exploration
- Arctic exploration
- Criticism of space exploration
- Space flight simulation game
