= Sakigake =

Japanese flyby mission to Halley's Comet (1985–1999)

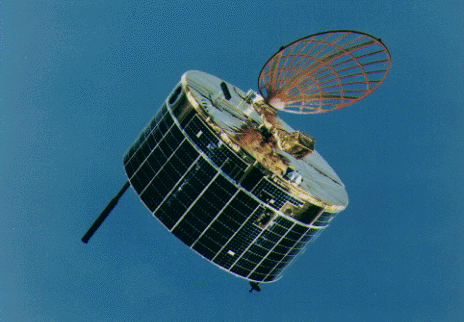
- Artist's rendering of the Sakigake spacecraft
- Mission type: Halley flyby
- Operator: ISAS
- COSPAR ID: 1985-001A
- SATCAT no.: 15464
- Mission duration: 14 years and 1 day

Spacecraft properties
- Launch mass: 138.1 kilograms (304 lb)

Start of mission
- Launch date: January 7, 1985, 19:27 UTC
- Rocket: Mu-3SII
- Launch site: Kagoshima

End of mission
- Last contact: Data: November 15, 1995; Beacon: January 8, 1999

Orbital parameters
- Reference system: Heliocentric
- Perihelion altitude: 0.92 AU
- Aphelion altitude: 1.15 AU
- Inclination: 0.07 degrees
- Period: 382.8 days

Flyby of 1P/Halley
- Closest approach: March 11, 1986, 04:18 UTC
- Distance: 6,990,000 kilometres (4,340,000 mi)

Sakigake (さきがけ; lit. 'pioneer', 'pathfinder'), known before launch as MS-T5, was Japan's first interplanetary spacecraft and the first deep space probe to be launched by any country other than the US or the Soviet Union. It aimed to demonstrate the performance of the new launch vehicle, test its ability to escape from Earth gravity, and observe the interplanetary medium and magnetic field. Sakigake also served as a reference probe for Halley's Comet. Early measurements would be used to improve the mission of the Suisei probe launched several months later.

Sakigake was developed by the Institute of Space and Astronautical Science for the National Space Development Agency (both of which are now part of the Japanese Aerospace Exploration Agency, or JAXA). It became a part of the Halley Armada together with Suisei, the Soviet Vega probes, the ESA Giotto and the NASA International Cometary Explorer, to explore Halley's Comet during its 1986 sojourn through the inner Solar System.

== Design ==
Unlike its twin Suisei, it carried no imaging instruments in its instrument payload.

== Launch ==
Sakigake was launched January 7, 1985, from Kagoshima Space Center by M-3SII launch vehicle on M-3SII-1 mission.

== Halley encounter ==
It carried out a flyby of Halley's Comet on March 11, 1986, at a distance of 6.99 million km.

== Giacobini-Zinner encounter ==
There were plans for the spacecraft to go on to an encounter with 21P/Giacobini-Zinner in 1998, but the flyby had to be abandoned because of a lack of propellant.

== End of mission ==
Telemetry contact was lost on November 15, 1995, though a beacon signal continued to be received until January 7, 1999.
