= Suisei (spacecraft) =

Japanese flyby mission to Halley's Comet (1985–1991)

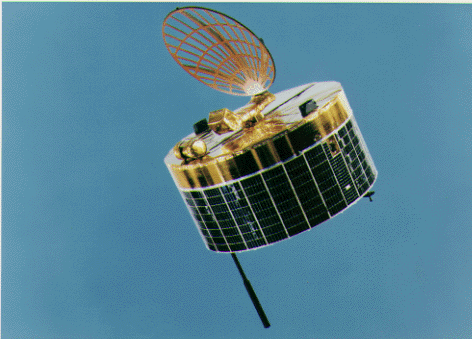
- An artist's rendering of the Suisei spacecraft
- Names: PLANET-A
- Mission type: Halley flyby
- Operator: ISAS
- COSPAR ID: 1985-073A
- SATCAT no.: 15967
- Website: isas.ac.jp
- Mission duration: 5 years, 6 months and 4 days

Spacecraft properties
- Launch mass: 139.5 kg (308 lb)

Start of mission
- Launch date: August 18, 1985 23:33 UTC
- Rocket: M-3SII
- Launch site: Uchinoura Space Center

End of mission
- Disposal: Decommissioned
- Deactivated: February 22, 1991

Orbital parameters
- Reference system: Heliocentric

Flyby of 1P/Halley
- Closest approach: March 8, 1986
- Distance: 151,000 km (94,000 mi)

Flyby of Earth
- Closest approach: August 20, 1992
- Distance: ~900,000 km (560,000 mi)

Suisei (すいせい; lit. "Comet"), originally known as Planet-A, was an uncrewed space probe developed by the Institute of Space and Astronautical Science (now part of the Japanese Aerospace Exploration Agency, or JAXA).

It constituted a part of the Halley Armada together with Sakigake, the Soviet Vega probes, the ESA Giotto and the NASA International Cometary Explorer, to explore Halley's Comet during its 1986 sojourn through the inner Solar System.

== Spacecraft ==
Suisei was identical in construction and shape to Sakigake, but carried a different payload: a CCD UV imaging system and a solar wind instrument.

The main objective of the mission was to take UV images of the hydrogen corona for about 30 days before and after Comet Halley's descending crossing of the ecliptic plane. Solar wind parameters were measured for a much longer time period.

The spacecraft was spin-stabilized at two different rates (5 and 0.2 rpm). Hydrazine thrusters were used for attitude and velocity control; star and Sun sensors were included for attitude control; and a mechanically despun off-set parabolic dish was used for long range communication.

== Launch ==
Suisei was launched on August 18, 1985, by M-3SII launch vehicle from Kagoshima Space Center on M-3SII-2 mission. It was sent on an intercept course with Comet Halley, after which it would remain in a heliocentric orbit for later use as long as it was viable.

== Halley encounter ==
Suisei began UV observations in November 1985, generating up to six images/day. The spacecraft encountered Comet Halley at 151,000 km on sunward side during March 8, 1986, suffering only two dust impacts which tilted the craft by 0.72 degrees. Suisei carried two instruments designed to study the growth and the decay of the cometary object's hydrogen corona, and the interaction of the solar wind with the cometary ionosphere. These observed a peak in Comet Halley's hydrogen emissions every 53 hours.

== Earth flyby ==
Fifteen burns of Suisei's 3 N motors during the period of April 5–10, 1987, yielded a 65 m/s velocity increase for a 60,000 km Earth gravity assist swingby on August 20, 1992, although the craft was then lost behind the Sun for the summer.

The hydrazine fuel was depleted on February 22, 1991. Preliminary tracking indicated a 900,000-km flyby of Earth had been achieved

== Other planned encounters ==
ISAS had decided during 1987 to guide Suisei to a November 24, 1998, encounter with 21P/Giacobini–Zinner, but due to depletion of the hydrazine, this, as well as plans to fly within several million kilometers of Comet 55P/Tempel–Tuttle on February 28, 1998, were cancelled.
