= Giotto (spacecraft) =

European mission to comets Halley and Grigg–Skjellerup (1985–1992)

- An artist's impression of Giotto.
- Mission type: Cometary flyby
- Operator: European Space Agency
- COSPAR ID: 1985-056A
- SATCAT no.: 15875
- Website: www.esa.int
- Mission duration: 7 years, 21 days

Spacecraft properties
- Spacecraft type: GEOS
- Manufacturer: British Aerospace
- Launch mass: 960 kg
- Power: 196 W

Start of mission
- Launch date: 11:23, 2 July 1985 (UTC)
- Rocket: Ariane 1 V-14
- Launch site: Kourou ELA-1
- Contractor: Arianespace

End of mission
- Disposal: Decommissioned
- Deactivated: 23 July 1992

Orbital parameters
- Reference system: Heliocentric
- Eccentricity: 0.17334
- Perihelion altitude: 0.73 AU
- Aphelion altitude: 1.04 AU
- Inclination: 2.09°
- Period: 304.6 days
- Epoch: 10 July 1992, 15:18:43 UTC

Flyby of 1P/Halley
- Closest approach: 14 March 1986
- Distance: 596 km (370 mi)

Flyby of Earth
- Closest approach: 2 July 1990
- Distance: 22,730 km (14,120 mi)

Flyby of 26P/Grigg-Skjellerup
- Closest approach: 10 July 1992
- Distance: 200 km (120 mi)

Flyby of Earth
- Closest approach: 1999
- Distance: ~1,000 km (620 mi)
- Legacy ESA insignia (2020s) Halley Armada

Giotto is a European robotic spacecraft mission from the European Space Agency. The spacecraft flew by and studied Halley's Comet and in doing so became the first spacecraft to make close up observations of a comet. On 13 March 1986, the spacecraft succeeded in approaching Halley's nucleus at a distance of 596 kilometers. It was named after the Early Italian Renaissance painter Giotto di Bondone. He had observed Halley's Comet in 1301 and was inspired to depict it as the star of Bethlehem in his painting Adoration of the Magi in the Scrovegni Chapel.

== Mission ==
=== Development ===
Giotto trajectory

Members of the ESA’s Solar System Working Group started investigating a mission to Halley’s comet in 1977 before rejecting it in August 1978 in favour of a lunar orbiter. Shortly afterwards this was reversed by the Science Advisory Committee and the ESA started to study a joint mission with NASA. This mission was to be the International Comet Mission consisting of a carrier NASA probe and smaller European probe based on the ISEE-2. The plan was for the American probe to release the European probe towards Halley for a close flyby before going on to explore Comet 10P/Tempel. The NASA probe was cancelled November 1979.

Proposals then moved to an Ariane 1 launched mission with the first option considered being one suggested by Giuseppe Colombo. Named HAPPEN it involved using parts for a planned Geos-3 satellite to first examine the earth's Magnetotail before flying through the tail of Halley’s comet in March 1986. This was rejected 24 January 1980 by the Solar System working group for not offering to return enough information on Halley. In February 1980 it was proposed that the Ariane 1 launch two Geos based probes. One to examine the magnetotail and the other to target Halley’s comet. It was at this point the name Giotto name started being used. The proposal was approved by the Science Advisory Committee and then moved onto the Science program committee. The Science program committee initially rejected the mission in favour of the Hipparcos satellite while giving Giotto at chance for a second submission without the Magnetotail mission but with more extensive planning and a budget of 80 million accounting units. In July 1980 the committee approved the second proposal with a budget of 80 million accounting units. The Hipparcos program, while delayed, also continued.

During March 1981 British Aerospace submitted its Geos based design to the ESA. This was rejected due to issues with power and temperature control. In the same period it was found that the Geos design had become outdated to the point where it was no longer possible to obtain parts. As a result a new and somewhat larger craft was designed although British Aerospace remained the primary contractor.

Originally it was planned to launch Giotto on an Ariane 2 along with a commercial satellite. This was then shifted to an Ariane 3 before difficulties with finding a customer who wanted to fly during the launch window resulted in Giotto being assigned solo to an Ariane 1 which was available after EXOSAT was launched by a Thor-Delta.

There were plans to have observation equipment on board a Space Shuttle in low-Earth orbit around the time of Giotto's fly-by, but they in turn fell through with the Challenger disaster.

The plan then became a cooperative armada of five space probes including Giotto, two from the Soviet Union's Vega program and two from Japan: the Sakigake and Suisei probes. The idea was for Japanese probes and the pre-existing American probe International Cometary Explorer to make long distance measurements, followed by the Soviet Vegas which would locate the nucleus, and the resulting information sent back would allow Giotto to precisely target very close to the nucleus. Because Giotto would pass so very close to the nucleus there was a risk it would not survive the encounter due to the spacecraft colliding at very high speed with the many dust particles from the comet with estimates of its chances of survival ranging from around 90% to zero. The coordinated group of probes became known as the Halley Armada.

== Design ==
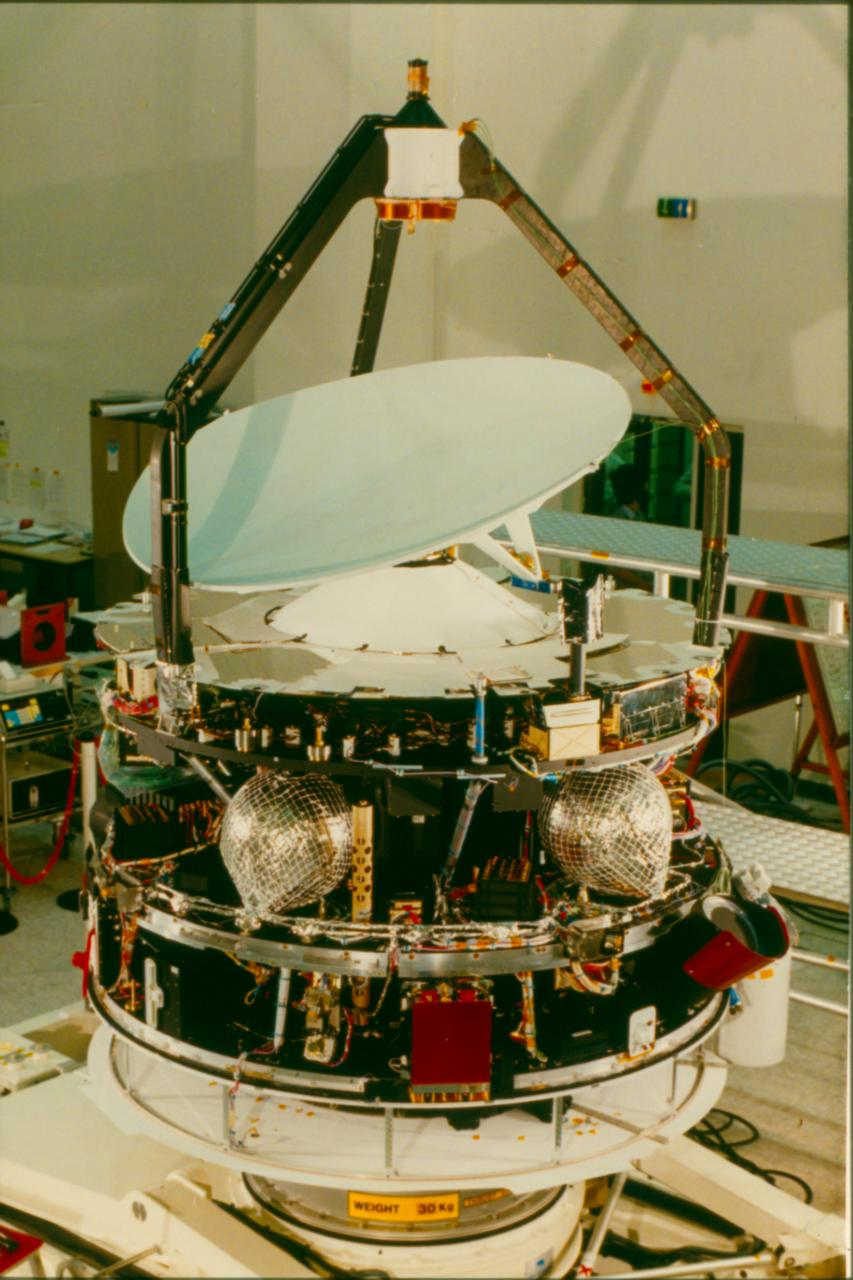
An image of the Giotto spacecraft during construction

The cylindrical spacecraft was 1.87 m in diameter 2.85m long. It had and had three internal platforms. Built by British Aerospace in Filton, Bristol, it carried a dust shield (Whipple shield) as proposed by Fred Whipple. The shield comprised a thin (1 mm) aluminium sheet separated by a space and a thicker (12 mm) Kevlar sheet. The later Stardust spacecraft would use a similar Whipple shield. Giotto also had a 1.51 m diameter antenna that it used to communicate with Earth. The craft was painted white using an electively conductive paint developed by Centre national d'études spatiales.

A mock-up of the spacecraft resides at the Bristol Aero Collection hangar, at Filton, Bristol, England.

The craft was equipped with a Mage motor made by Societe Europeenne de Propulsion.

=== Science Instruments ===
Giotto had 10 science instruments.

- MAG: a magnetometer
- HMC (Halley Multicolour Camera): a 16-cm telescope and camera
- DID (Dust Impactor Detector System): measured the mass of dust particles that hit the instrument
- RPA (Rème Plasma Analyser): studied solar wind and charged particles
- JPA (Johnstone Plasma Analyser): also measured solar wind and charged particles
- PIA (Particulate Impact Analyser): studied the size and chemistry of particles
- OPE (Optical Probe Experiment): examined the emissivity of gas and dust behind the spacecraft
- EPA (Energetic Particle Analyser): analyzed alpha-particles, electrons, and neutrons
- NMS (Neutral Mass Spectrometer): measured the composition of the particles around the comet
- IMS (Ion Mass Spectrometer): measured the amount of ions from the sun and the comet
- GRE (Giotto Radio Experiment): used Giotto's radio signals to study Halley's comet

== Timeline ==
=== Pre launch ===
The ESA took possession of the probe on 22 April 1985 and later that month it was flown to French Guiana minus its camera. The camera made the transatlantic trip on 17 May. A 22 day launch window existed starting 11:13 UTC 2 July. In the final minutes before launch the temperature of the probe started to drop below minus 20 centigrade due to being cooled by the rocket's liquid helium. This did not ultimately cause problems.

=== Launch ===
The mission was launched on an Ariane 1 rocket (flight V14) on 2 July 1985 from Kourou, French Guiana. The craft was controlled from the European Space Agency ESOC facilities in Darmstadt (then West Germany) initially in Geostationary Transfer Orbit (GTO) then in the Near Earth Phase (NEP) before the longer Cruise Phase through to the encounter. While in GTO a number of slew and spin-up manoeuvres (to 90 RPM) were carried out in preparation for the firing of the Apogee Boost Motor (ABM), although unlike orbit circularisations for geostationary orbit, the ABM for Giotto was fired at perigee. Attitude determination and control used sun pulse and IR Earth sensor data in the telemetry to determine the spacecraft orientation.

=== Cruise phase ===
On 13 September 1985 Giotto's camera was tested by photographing Vega. In order to provide a brighter target, Earth was imaged 18 and 23 October. All these tests were successful. In January 1986 a delay in sending instructions to the Giotto resulted in it entering a safe mode. It was returned to normal operations with the help of the NASA deep space network.The probe was hit by a solar flare on 8 February but suffered no damage.

=== Halley encounter ===
The Soviet Vega 1 started returning images of Halley on 4 March 1986, and the first ever of its nucleus, and made its flyby on 6 March, followed by Vega 2 making its flyby on 9 March. 4 March was also the date when Giotto took its first distant photo of the comet from a range of 59 million kilometres. A final course correction took place on 12 March aiming to put the probe 540 km from nucleus. The distance was chosen as 500 km was the minimum distance at which Giotto's camera could track the comet with the additional 40 km being the uncertainly in the comet's position. Three hours prior to the probe reaching its minimum distance from the comet the camera began following its encounter program taking a photo every 4 seconds. This revealed it was tracking the comet at the wrong speed and a last minute correction to its programming had to be made.

Giotto passed Halley successfully on 14 March 1986 at 596 km distance, and surprisingly survived despite being hit by some small particles. One impact 7.6 seconds before closest approach sent it spinning off its stabilized spin axis so that its antenna no longer always pointed at the Earth, and its dust shield no longer protected some of its instruments. After 32 minutes Giotto re-stabilized itself and continued full radio contact with earth.

Another impact destroyed the Halley Multicolor Camera, but not before it took photographs of the nucleus at closest approach. The Neutral Mass Spectrometer was also lost. In addition to scientific instruments the probe also had its star mapper and insulation damaged. The dust impact detection system suffered a partial failure when then the protective cover on IPM-A failed to open although data was obtained after Halley’s dust destroyed the cover..

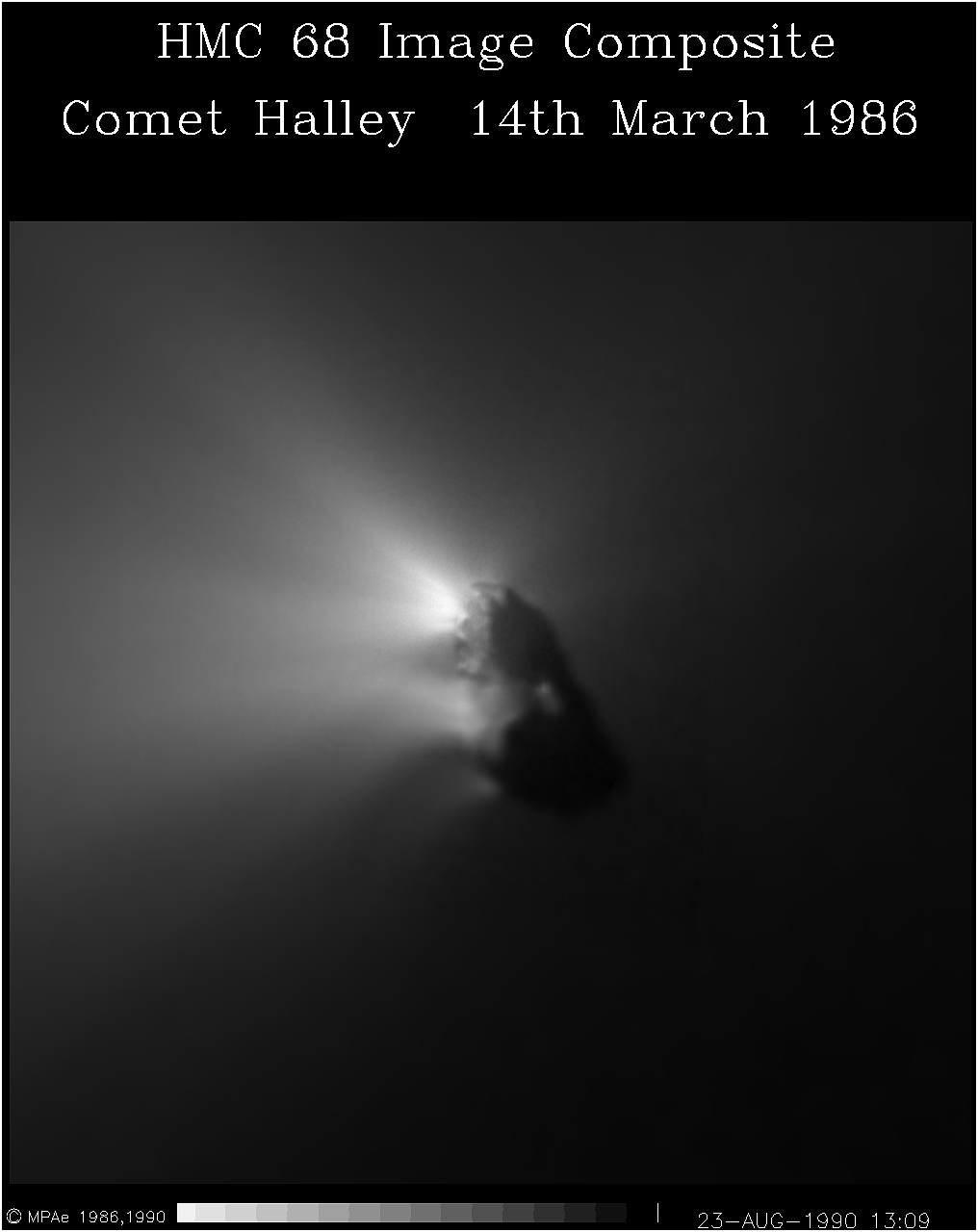
Comet Halley at Giotto spacecraft's closest approach

=== First Earth flyby ===
Giotto's trajectory was adjusted for an Earth flyby and its science instruments were turned off on 15 March 1986 at 02:00 UTC.

=== Grigg–Skjellerup encounter ===
Giotto was commanded to wake up on 2 July 1990 when it flew by Earth in order to sling shot to its next cometary encounter.

The probe then flew by the Comet Grigg–Skjellerup on 10 July 1992 which it approached to a distance of about 200 km. Afterwards, Giotto was again switched off on 23 July 1992.

The cost of this mission extension was $6.3 million.

=== Second Earth flyby ===
In 1999 Giotto made another Earth flyby but was not reactivated.

== Scientific results ==
Images showed Halley's nucleus to be a dark peanut-shaped body, 15 km long, 7 km to 10 km wide. Only 10% of the surface was active, with at least three outgassing jets seen on the sunlit side. Analysis showed the comet formed 4.5 billion years ago from volatiles (mainly ice) that had condensed onto interstellar dust particles. It had remained practically unaltered since its formation.

Measured volume of material ejected by Halley:

- 80% water,
- 10% carbon monoxide
- 2.5% a mix of methane and ammonia.
- other hydrocarbons, iron, and sodium were detected in trace amounts.

Giotto found Halley's nucleus was dark, which suggested a thick covering of dust.

The nucleus's surface was rough and of a porous quality, with the density of the whole nucleus as low as 0.3 g/cm^{3}. Sagdeev's team estimated a density of 0.6 g/cm^{3}, but S. J. Peale warned that all estimates had error bars too large to be informative.

The quantity of material ejected was found to be three tonnes per second for seven jets, and these caused the comet to wobble over long time periods.

The dust ejected was mostly only the size of cigarette smoke particles, with masses ranging from 10 ag to 0.4 g. (See Orders of magnitude (mass).) The mass of the particle that impacted Giotto and sent it spinning was not measured, but from its effects—it also probably broke off a piece of Giotto—the mass has been estimated to lie between 0.1 g and 1 g.

Two kinds of dust were seen: one with carbon, hydrogen, nitrogen and oxygen; the other with calcium, iron, magnesium, silicon and sodium.

The ratio of abundances of the comet's light elements excluding nitrogen (i.e. hydrogen, carbon, oxygen) were the same as the Sun's. The implication is that the constituents of Halley are among the most primitive in the Solar System.

The plasma and ion mass spectrometer instruments showed Halley has a carbon-rich surface.

=== Spacecraft achievements ===
- Giotto made the closest approach to Halley's Comet and provided the best data for this comet.
- Giotto was the first spacecraft:

- to provide detailed pictures of a cometary nucleus.
- to make a close flyby of two comets. Young and active comet Halley could be compared to old comet Grigg–Skjellerup.
- to return from interplanetary space and perform an Earth swing-by.
- to be re-activated from hibernation mode.
- to use Earth for a gravity assist.

== Giotto II proposals ==
A proposal was made to use spare parts to build a backup craft. A second proposal was made to use a Giotto based probe to return a sample of a comet coma with a re-entry capsule in place of the Mage motor.

== See also ==
- Timeline of Solar System exploration
- Rosetta (spacecraft)
- Philae (spacecraft)
