= Halley Armada =

Space probes

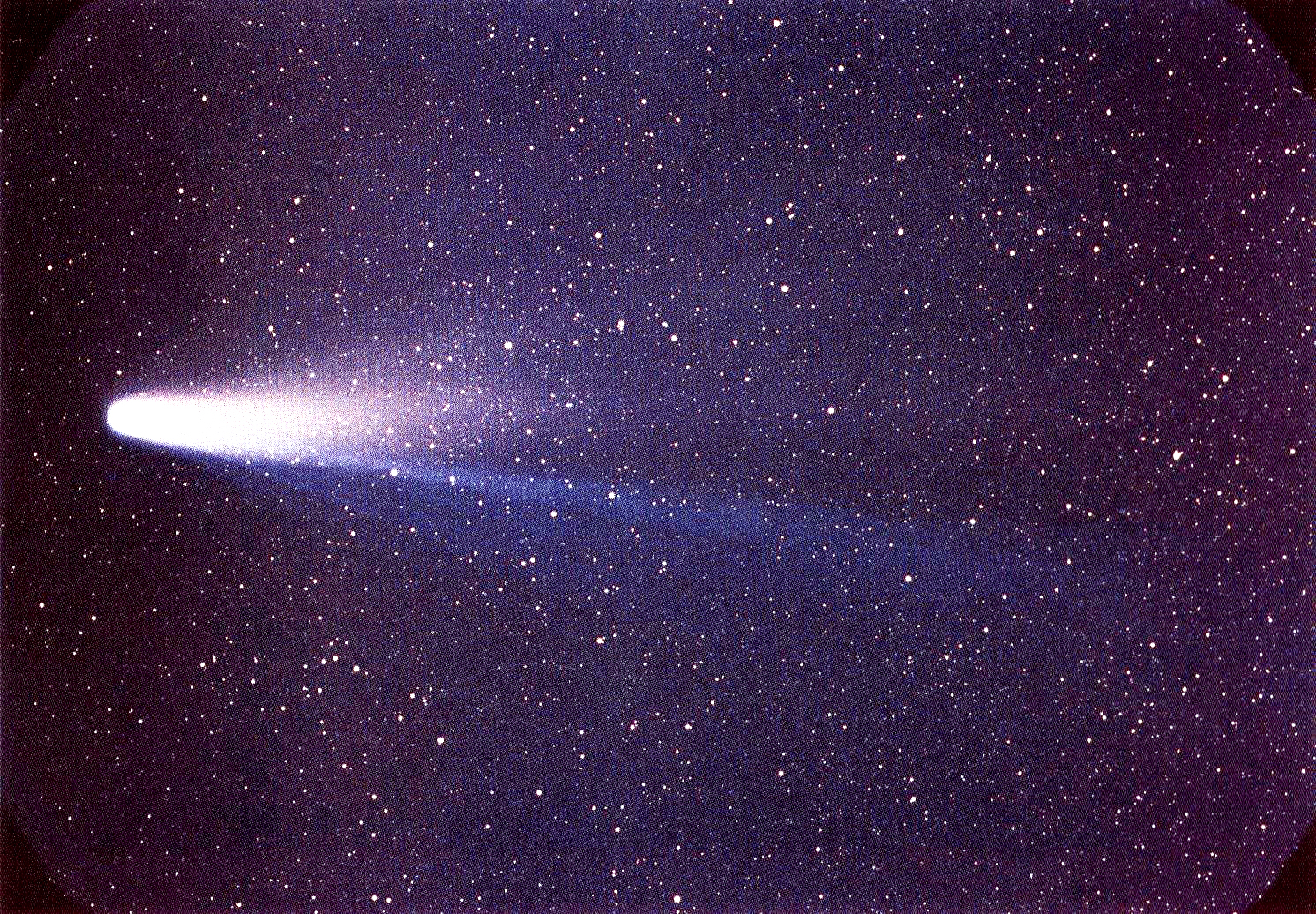
Halley's Comet in 1986

The Halley Armada was a series of space probes, five of which were successful, sent to examine Halley's Comet during its 1986 passage through the inner Solar System. The armada included one probe from the European Space Agency, two probes that were joint projects between the Soviet Union and France and two probes from the Institute of Space and Astronautical Science in Japan. NASA did not contribute a probe to the Halley Armada.

== Main space probes ==
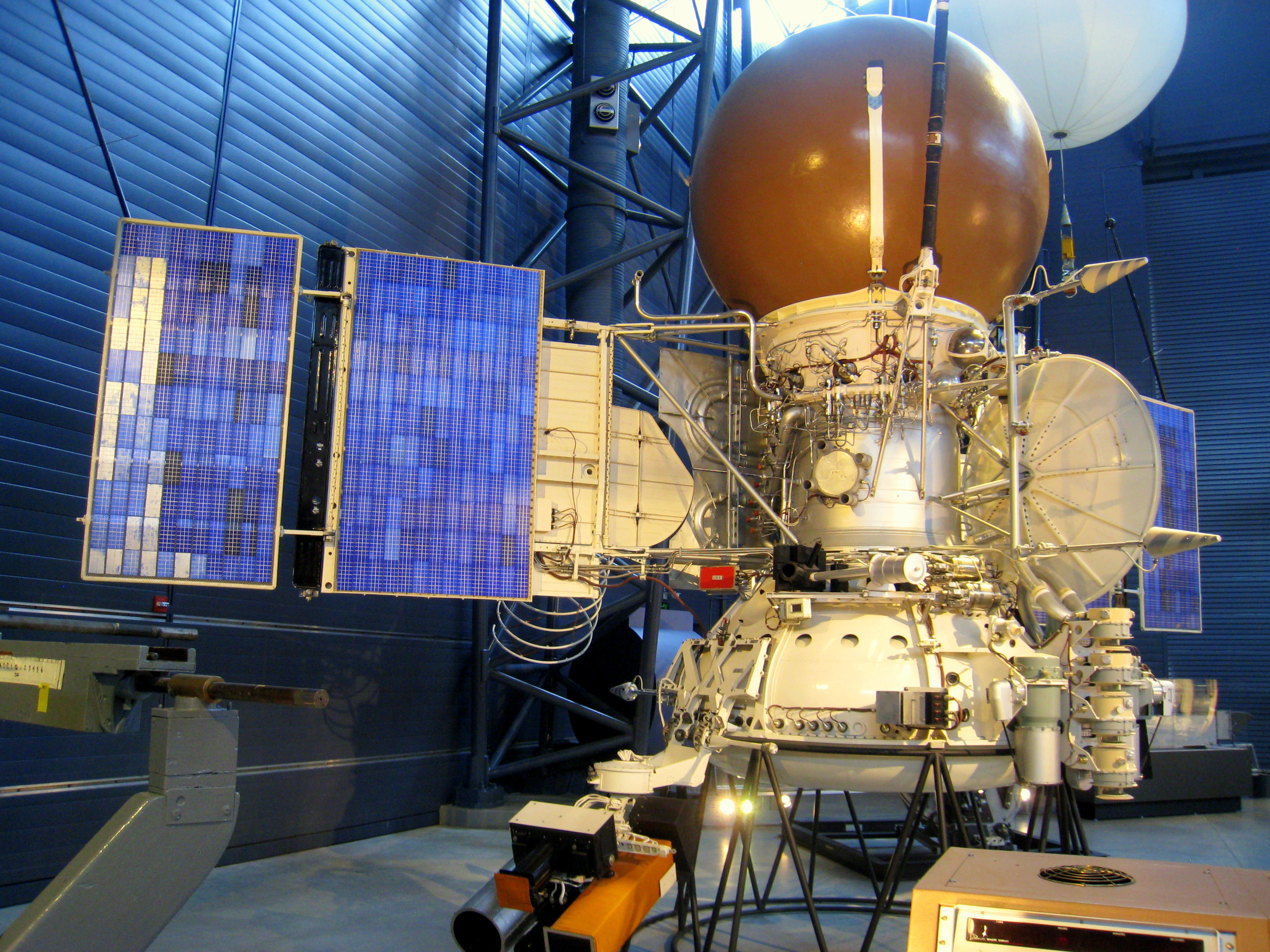
Vega probe model

Probe	Space agency	Date of closest approach	Distance	Details
Giotto	ESA	March 14, 1986	596 km	The first space probe to get close-up color images of the nucleus of a comet.
Vega 2	USSR/France Intercosmos	March 9, 1986	8,030 km	Dropped a balloon probe and lander on Venus before going on to Halley
Vega 1	USSR/France Intercosmos	March 6, 1986	8,889 km	Dropped a balloon probe and lander on Venus before going on to Halley.
Suisei	ISAS	March 8, 1986	151,000 km	Also known as PLANET-A. Data from Sakigake was used to improve upon Suisei for its dedicated mission to study Halley.
Sakigake	ISAS	March 11, 1986	6.99 million km	Japan's first probe to leave the Earth system, mainly a test of interplanetary mission technology.

Without the measurements from the other space probes, Giotto's closest distance would have been 4,000 km instead of the 596 km achieved.

== Other missions ==
Other space probes had their instruments examining Halley's Comet:

- Pioneer 7 was launched on August 17, 1966. It was put into heliocentric orbit with a mean distance of 1.1 AU to study the solar magnetic field, the solar wind, and cosmic rays at widely separated points in solar orbit. On 20 March 1986, the spacecraft flew within 12.3 million kilometers of Halley's Comet and monitored the interaction between the cometary hydrogen tail and the solar wind.
- Pioneer Venus Orbiter in orbit of Venus, was positioned perfectly to take measurements of Halley's Comet during its perihelion February 9, 1986. Its UV-spectrometer observed the water loss when Halley's Comet was difficult to observe from the Earth.
- International Cometary Explorer, which was repurposed as a cometary probe in 1982 and visited Comet Giacobini-Zinner in 1985, transited between the Sun and Halley's Comet in late March 1986 and took measurements.

=== Failed and cancelled missions ===
The Space Shuttle Challenger, on its launch on January 28, 1986, was carrying SPARTAN-203 with the mission to make observations of Halley's Comet. STS-51L failed to reach orbit, resulting in the total loss of crew and vehicle. That launch failure resulted in the cancellation of dozens of subsequent shuttle missions, including the next scheduled launch, STS-61-E, planned for March 6, 1986, with a payload including the ASTRO-1 observatory, which was intended to make astronomical observations of Halley's Comet.

The International Comet Mission, consisting of a carrier NASA probe and a smaller European probe based on the ISEE-2 design, with the intention that the American probe would release the European probe towards Halley for a close flyby, before going on to explore Comet 10P/Tempel itself. The NASA probe was cancelled November 1979.
