= International Cometary Explorer =

NASA satellite of the Explorer program

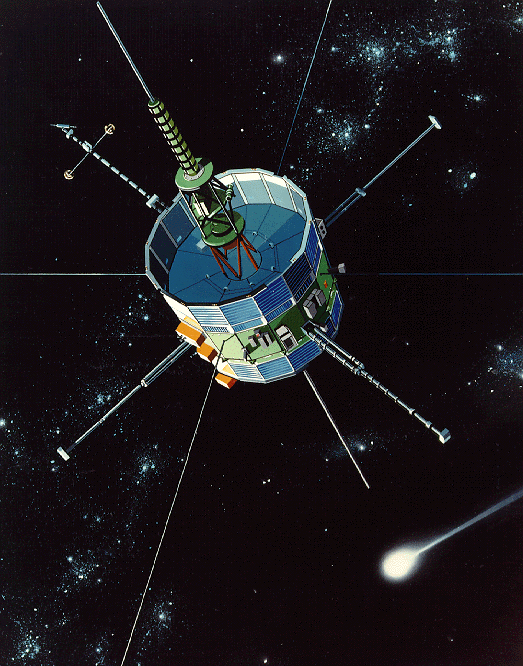
- Artist's concept of ICE
- Names: ISEE-3; International Sun-Earth Explorer-C; Explorer 59
- Mission type: Magnetospheric research ISEE-3: Sun/Earth L_{1} orbiter Earth: 21P/G-Z, Halley's Comet and Earth fly-by
- Operator: NASA
- COSPAR ID: 1978-079A
- SATCAT no.: 11004
- Mission duration: Launch to last routine contact: 18 years, 8 months, 22 days Launch to last contact: 36 years, 1 month, 3 days

Spacecraft properties
- Spacecraft: Explorer LIX
- Spacecraft type: International Sun-Earth Explorer
- Bus: ISEE
- Manufacturer: Fairchild Industries
- Launch mass: 479 kg (1,056 lb)
- Dry mass: 390 kg (860 lb)
- Dimensions: 1.77 × 1.58 m (5 ft 10 in × 5 ft 2 in)
- Power: 173 watts

Start of mission
- Launch date: 12 August 1978, 15:12 UTC
- Rocket: Thor-Delta 2914 (Thor 633 / Delta 144)
- Launch site: Cape Canaveral, SLC-17B
- Contractor: Douglas Aircraft Company
- Entered service: 12 August 1978

End of mission
- Deactivated: 5 May 1997
- Last contact: 16 September 2014

Orbital parameters
- Reference system: Heliocentric orbit
- Perihelion altitude: 1 AU (150,000,000 km; 93,000,000 mi)
- Aphelion altitude: 1 AU (150,000,000 km; 93,000,000 mi)
- Inclination: 0.10°
- Period: 1 year
Instruments
- Solar Wind Plasma Experiment
- Helium Vector Magnetometer
- Low Energy Cosmic Ray Experiment
- Medium Energy Cosmic Ray Experiment
- High Energy Cosmic Ray Experiment
- Plasma Wave Instrument
- Low Energy Proton Experiment
- Cosmic Ray Electrons and Nuclei
- X-Rays and Electrons Instrument
- Radio Mapping Experiment
- Plasma Composition Experiment
- Heavy Isotope Spectrometer Telescope
- Ground-Based Solar Studies Experiment

The International Cometary Explorer (ICE) spacecraft, designed and launched as the International Sun-Earth Explorer-3 (ISEE-3) satellite, was launched on 12 August 1978 into a heliocentric orbit. It was one of three spacecraft, along with the mother/daughter pair of ISEE-1 and ISEE-2, built for the International Sun-Earth Explorer (ISEE) program, a joint effort by NASA and ESRO/ESA to study the interaction between the Earth's magnetic field and the solar wind.

ISEE-3 was the first spacecraft to be placed in a halo orbit at the L_{1} Earth–Sun Lagrange point. Renamed ICE, it became the first spacecraft to visit a comet, passing through the plasma tail of comet Giacobini-Zinner within about 7,800 km (4,800 mi) of the nucleus on 11 September 1985.

NASA suspended routine contact with ISEE-3 in 1997 and made brief status checks in 1999 and 2008.

On 29 May 2014, two-way communication with the spacecraft was reestablished by the ISEE-3 Reboot Project, an unofficial group, with support from the Skycorp company and SpaceRef Interactive. On 2 July 2014, they fired the thrusters for the first time since 1987. However, later firings of the thrusters failed, apparently due to a lack of nitrogen pressure in the fuel tanks. The project team initiated an alternative plan to use the spacecraft to "collect scientific data and send it back to Earth", but on 16 September 2014, contact with the probe was lost.

== Original mission: International Sun/Earth Explorer 3 (ISEE-3) ==
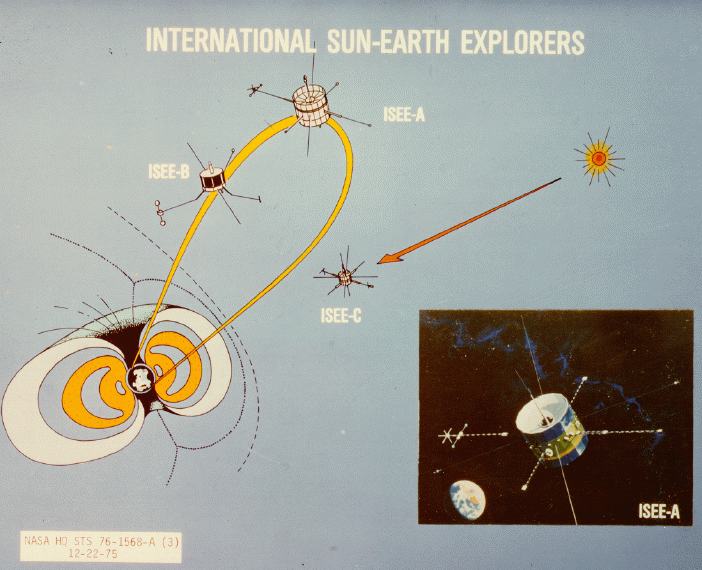
International Sun/Earth Explorer's orbits

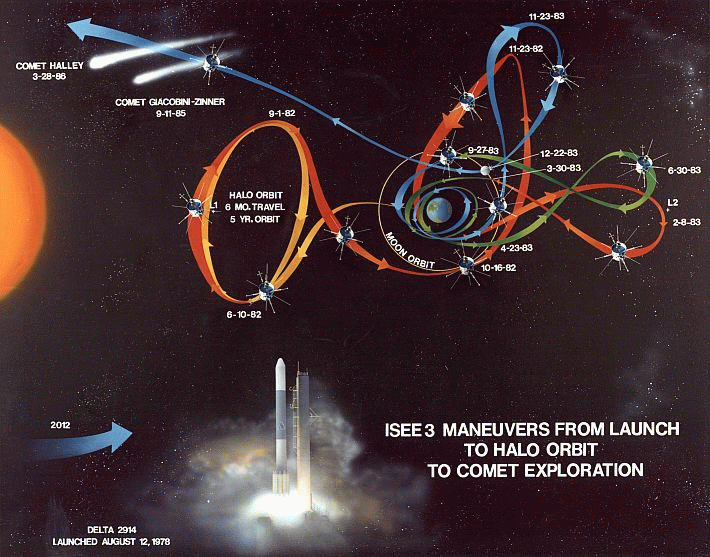
ICE mission

Top-down view of the orbit of ICE relative to the inner Solar System in and after 2009.

ISEE-3 carries no cameras; instead, its instruments measure energetic particles, waves, plasmas, and fields.

ISEE-3 originally operated in a halo orbit about the L_{1} Sun-Earth Lagrange point, 235 Earth radii above the surface (about 1,500,000 km (930,000 mi). It was the first artificial object placed at a so-called "libration point", entering orbit there on 20 November 1978, proving that such a suspension between gravitational fields was possible. It rotates at 19.76 rpm about an axis perpendicular to the ecliptic, to keep it oriented for its experiments, to generate solar power and to communicate with Earth.

The purposes of the mission were:

- to investigate solar-terrestrial relationships at the outermost boundaries of the Earth's magnetosphere;
- to examine in detail the structure of the solar wind near the Earth and the shock wave that forms the interface between the solar wind and Earth's magnetosphere;
- to investigate motions of and mechanisms operating in the plasma sheets; and,
- to continue the investigation of cosmic rays and solar flare emissions in the interplanetary region near 1 AU.

== Second mission: International Cometary Explorer ==
When NASA rejected space probe mission to Halley’s Comet, Frederick L. Scarf of TRW, with a help of NASA's Robert W. Farquhar, found a way to bypass bureaucracy "to gain control of an orbiting research satellite that had already outlived its usefulness". ISEE-3 was sent from its L1 point to the comet Giacobini-Zinner in September 1985; Scarf himself told the reporter: “We stole it [the satellite]”. The probe proved that the comet "sends out shock waves as it passes through space". ISEE-3 became the first space probe that studied a comet.

After completing its original mission, ISEE-3 was re-tasked to study the interaction between the solar wind and a cometary atmosphere. On 10 June 1982, the spacecraft performed a maneuver which removed it from its halo orbit around the L_{1} point and placed it in a transfer orbit. This involved a series of passages between Earth and the Sun-Earth L_{2} Lagrange point, through the Earth's magnetotail. Fifteen propulsive maneuvers and five lunar gravity assists resulted in the spacecraft being ejected from the Earth-Moon system and into a heliocentric orbit. Its last and closest pass over the Moon, on 22 December 1983, was only 119.4 km (74.2 mi) above the lunar surface; following this pass, the spacecraft was re-designated as the International Cometary Explorer (ICE).

=== Giacobini-Zinner encounter ===
Its new orbit put it ahead of the Earth on a trajectory to intercept comet Giacobini-Zinner. On 11 September 1985, the craft passed through the comet's plasma tail. ICE did a flyby of the comet nucleus at a distance of 7,800 km (4,800 mi) of the nucleus on 11 September 1985.

=== Halley encounter ===
ICE transited between the Sun and Comet Halley in late March 1986, when other spacecraft were near the comet on their early-March comet rendezvous missions. (This "Halley Armada" included Giotto, Vega 1 and 2, Suisei and Sakigake.) ICE flew through the tail; its minimum distance to the comet nucleus was 28×10^{6} km (17×10^{6} mi). For comparison, Earth's minimum distance to Comet Halley in 1910 was 20.8×10^{6} km (12.9×10^{6} mi).

=== Heliospheric mission ===
An update to the ICE mission was approved by NASA in 1991. It defines a heliospheric mission for ICE consisting of investigations of coronal mass ejections in coordination with ground-based observations, continued cosmic ray studies, and the Ulysses probe. By May 1995, ICE was being operated under a low-duty cycle, with some data-analysis support from the Ulysses project.

=== End of mission ===
On 5 May 1997, NASA ended the ICE mission, leaving only a carrier signal operating. The ISEE-3/ICE downlink bit rate was nominally 2048 bits per second during the early part of the mission, and 1024 bit/s during the 21P/Giacobini–Zinner comet encounter. The bit rate then successively dropped to 512 bit/s (on 9 December 1985), 256 bit/s (on 5 January 1987), 128 bit/s (on 24 January 1989) and finally to 64 bit/s (on 27 December 1991). Though still in space, NASA donated the craft to the Smithsonian Museum.

By January 1990, ICE was in a 355-day heliocentric orbit with an aphelion of 1.03 AU, a perihelion of 0.93 AU and an inclination of 0.1°.

=== Further contact ===
In 1999, NASA made brief contact with ICE to verify its carrier signal. On 18 September 2008, NASA, with the help of KinetX, located ICE using the NASA Deep Space Network after discovering that it had not been powered off after the 1999 contact. A status check revealed that 12 of its 13 experiments were still functioning, and it still had enough propellant for 150 m/s (490 ft/s) of Δv. It was determined to be possible to reactivate the spacecraft in 2014, when it again made a close approach to Earth, and scientists discussed reusing the probe to observe more comets in 2017 or 2018.

== ISEE-3 Reboot Project ==
Sometime after NASA's interest in the ICE waned others realized that the spacecraft might be steered to pass close to another comet. A team of engineers, programmers, and scientists began to study the feasibility and challenges involved.

In April 2014, its members formally announced their intentions to "recapture" the spacecraft for use, calling the effort the ISEE-3 Reboot Project. A team webpage said, "We intend to contact the ISEE-3 (International Sun-Earth Explorer) spacecraft, command it to fire its engine and enter an orbit near Earth, and then resume its original mission... If we are successful we intend to facilitate the sharing and interpretation of all of the new data ISEE-3 sends back via crowd-sourcing".

On 15 May 2014, the project reached its crowdfunding goal of US$125,000 on RocketHub, which was expected to cover the costs of writing the software to communicate with the probe, searching through the NASA archives for the information needed to control the spacecraft, and buying time on the dish antennas. The project then set a "stretch goal" of US$150,000, which it also met with a final total of US$159,502 raised.

The project members were working on deadline: if they got the spacecraft to change its orbit by late May or early June 2014, or in early July by using more fuel, it could use the Moon's gravity to get back into a useful halo orbit.

=== Replacing lost hardware ===
Earlier in 2014, officials with the Goddard Space Flight Center said the NASA Deep Space Network equipment necessary to transmit signals to the spacecraft had been decommissioned in 1999 and was too expensive to replace. However, project members were able to find documentation for the original equipment and were able to simulate the complex modulator/demodulator electronics using modern software-defined radio (SDR) techniques and open-source programs from the GNU Radio project. They obtained the needed hardware, an off-the-shelf SDR transceiver, and power amplifier, and installed it on the 305 m (1,001 ft) Arecibo dish antenna on 19 May 2014. Once they gained control of the spacecraft, the capture team planned to shift the primary ground station to the 21 m (69 ft) dish located at Morehead State University Space Science Center of Kentucky. The 20 m (66 ft) dish antenna in Bochum Observatory, Germany, would be a support station.

Although NASA was not funding the project, it made advisors available and gave approval to try to establish contact. On 21 May 2014, NASA announced that it had signed a Non-Reimbursable Space Act Agreement with the ISEE-3 Reboot Project. "This is the first time NASA has worked such an agreement for use of a spacecraft the agency is no longer using or ever planned to use again", officials said.

=== Contact reestablished ===
On 29 May 2014, the reboot team successfully commanded the probe to switch into Engineering Mode to begin to broadcast telemetry.

On 26 June 2014, project members using the Goldstone Deep Space Communications Complex DSS-24 antenna achieved synchronous communication and obtained the four ranging points needed to refine the spacecraft's orbital parameters. The project team received approval from NASA to continue operations through at least 16 July 2014, and made plans to attempt the orbital maneuver in early July.

On 2 July 2014, the reboot project fired the thrusters for the first time since 1987. They spun up the spacecraft to its nominal roll rate, in preparation for the upcoming trajectory correction maneuver in mid-July.

On 8 July 2014, a longer sequence of thruster firings failed, apparently due to loss of the nitrogen gas needed to pressurize the fuel tanks.

On 24 July 2014, the ISEE-3 Reboot Team announced that all attempts to change orbit using the ISEE-3 propulsion system had failed. Instead, the team said, the ISEE-3 Interplanetary Citizen Science Mission would gather data as the spacecraft flies by the Moon on 10 August 2014 and enters a heliocentric orbit similar to Earth's. The team began shutting down propulsion components to maximize the electrical power available for the science experiments.

On 30 July 2014, the team announced that it still planned to acquire data from as much of ISEE-3's 300-day orbit as possible. With five of the 13 instruments on the spacecraft still working, the science possibilities included listening for gamma-ray bursts, where observations from additional locations in the Solar System can be valuable. The team was also recruiting additional receiving sites around the globe to improve diurnal coverage, in order to upload additional commands while the spacecraft is close to Earth and later to receive data.

On 10 August 2014 at 18:16 UTC, the spacecraft passed about 15,600 km (9,700 mi) from the surface of the Moon. It will continue in its heliocentric orbit and will return to the vicinity of Earth in 2031.

=== Contact lost ===
On 25 September 2014, the Reboot team announced that contact with the probe was lost on 16 September 2014. It is unknown whether contact can be reestablished because the probe's exact orbit is uncertain. The spacecraft's post-lunar flyby orbit takes it further from the Sun, causing electrical power available from its solar arrays to drop, and its battery failed in 1981. Reduced power could have caused the craft to enter a safe mode, from which it may be impossible to awaken without the precise orbital location information needed to point transmissions at the craft.

== Spacecraft design ==
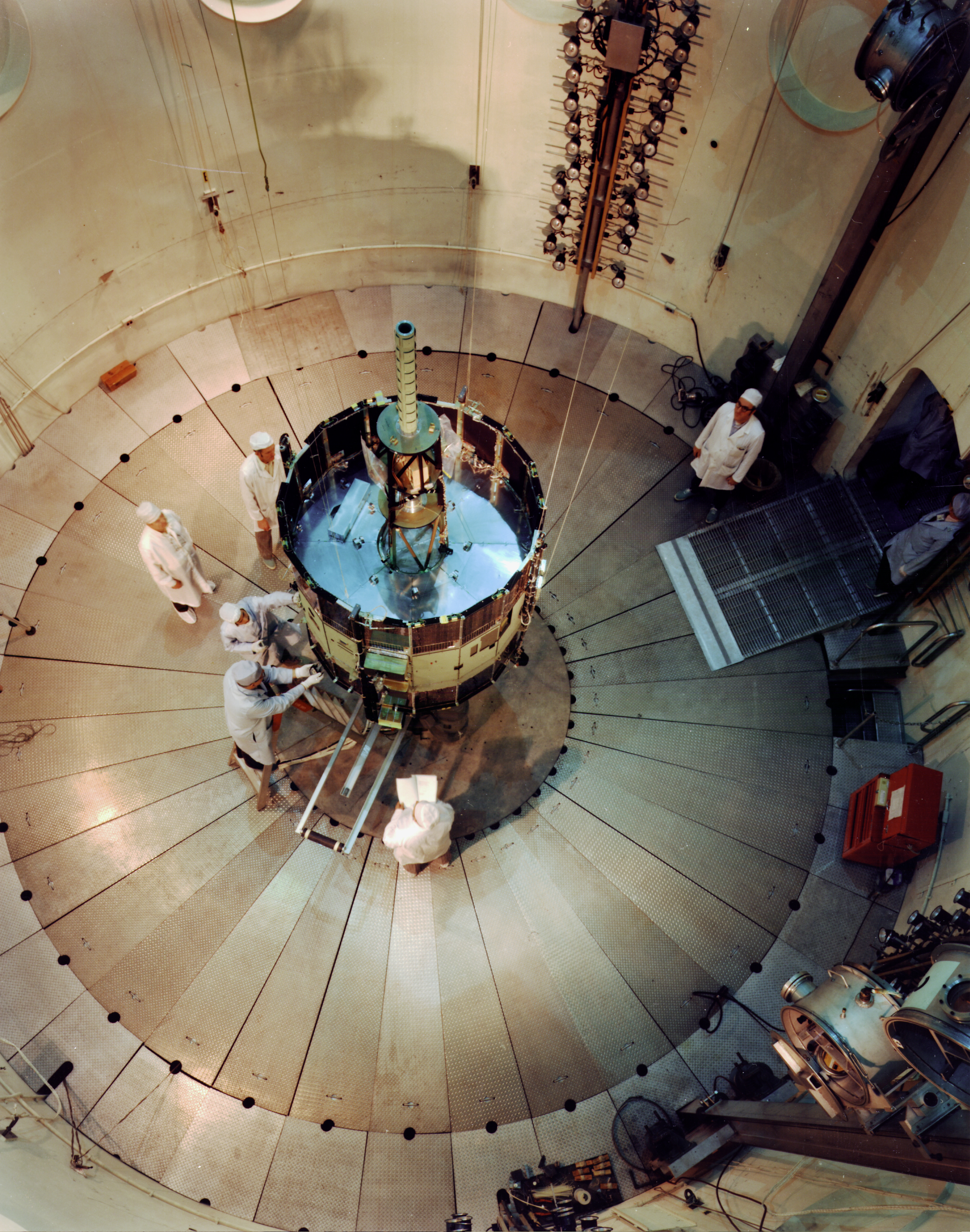
The ISEE-3 (later ICE), undergoing testing and evaluation.

The ICE spacecraft is a barrel-like cylindrical shape covered by solar panels. Four long antennas protrude equidistant around the circumference of the spacecraft, spanning 91 m (299 ft). It has a dry mass of 390 kg (860 lb) and can generate nominal power of 173 watts.

=== Payload ===
ICE carries 13 scientific instruments to measure plasmas, energetic particles, waves, and fields. As of July 2014, five were known to be functional. It does not carry a camera or imaging system. Its detectors measure high-energy particles such as X- and gamma-rays, solar wind, plasma and cosmic particles. A data handling system gathers the scientific and engineering data from all systems in the spacecraft and formats them into a serial stream for transmission. The transmitter output power is five watts.

=== Scientific payload and experiments ===
- Cosmic Ray Electrons and Nuclei;
- Ground Based Solar Studies Experiment;
- Heavy Isotope Spectrometer Telescope;
- High Energy Cosmic Ray Experiment;
- Low Energy Cosmic Ray Experiment;
- Low Energy Proton Experiment, also known as the Energetic Particle Anisotropy Spectrometer (EPAS);
- Medium Energy Cosmic Ray Experiment;
- Plasma Composition Experiment;
- Plasma Wave Instrument;
- Radio Mapping Experiment;
- Solar Wind Plasma Experiment, failed after 26 February 1980;
- Vector Helium Magnetometer;
- X-Rays and Electrons Instrument.

== Publications ==
- Birmingham, Thomas J.; Dessler, Alexander J. (1998). Comet Encounters. American Geophysical Union. Bibcode:1998coen.book.....B. ISBN 978-1-118-66875-7.
- Ogilvie, K. W.; Durney, A.; von Rosenvinge, T. (July 1978). "Descriptions of Experimental Investigations and Instruments for the ISEE Spacecraft". IEEE Transactions on Geoscience Electronics. GE-16 (3): 151–153. Bibcode:1978ITGE...16..151.. doi:10.1109/TGE.1978.294535. S2CID 10197087.
- von Rosenvinge, Tycho T.; Brandt, John C.; Farquhar, Robert W. (April 1986). "The International Cometary Explorer Mission to Comet Giacobini-Zinner". Science. 232 (4748): 353–356. Bibcode:1986Sci...232..353V. doi:10.1126/science.232.4748.353. PMID 17792143. S2CID 45258658.
