= Comet =

Natural object in space that releases gas

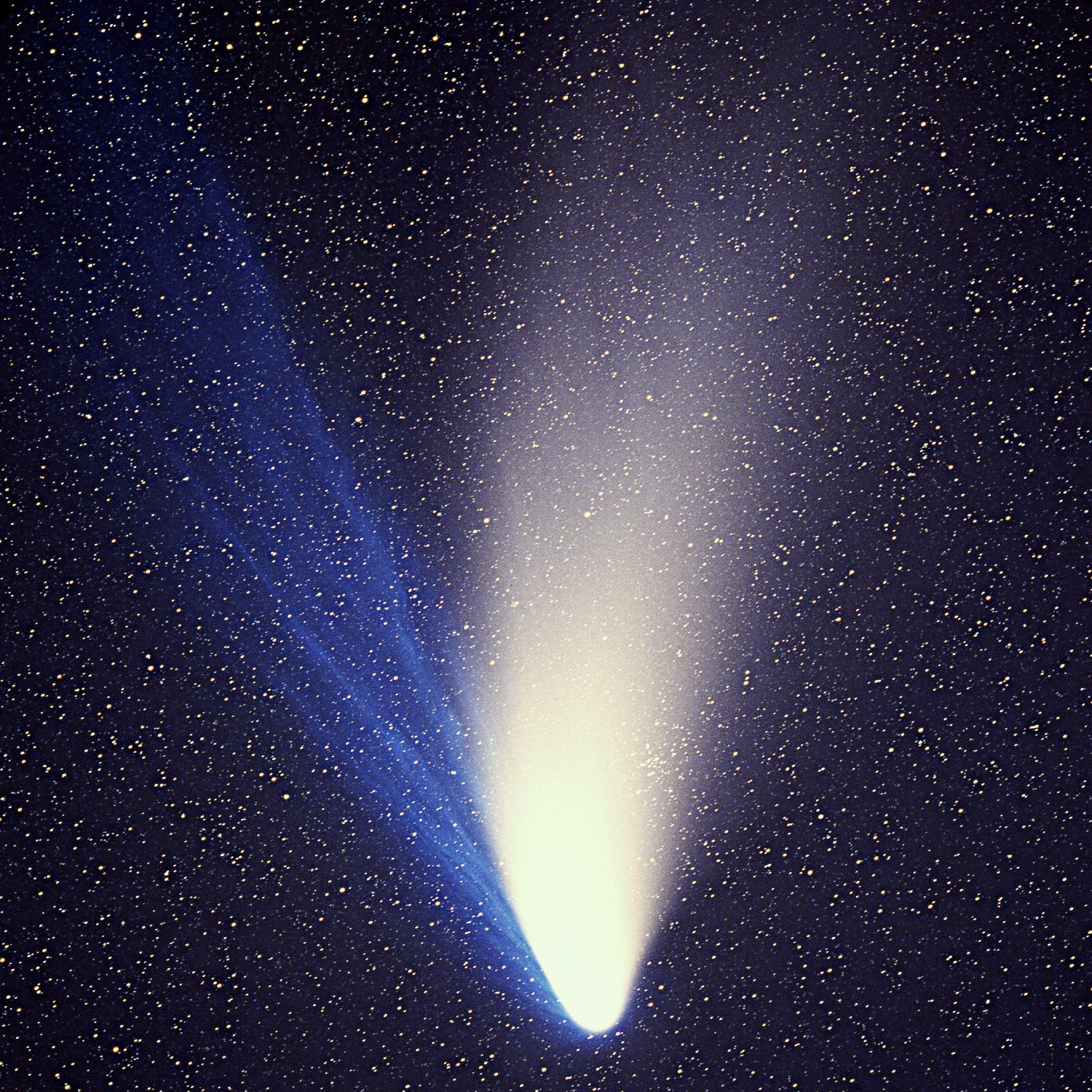
- Comet Hale–Bopp after passing perihelion in April 1997

Characteristics
- Type: Small solar system body
- Found: Star systems
- Mass range: 10^{11} kg to 10^{17} kg
- Size range: Typically less than 10 km wide (nucleus)
- Density: 0.6 g/cm^{3} (average)

External links
- Media category
- Q3559

Additional Information

A comet is an icy, small Solar System body or interstellar object that warms and begins to release gases when passing close to the Sun, a process called outgassing. This produces an extended, gravitationally unbound atmosphere or coma surrounding the nucleus, and sometimes a tail of gas and dust gas blown out from the coma. These phenomena are due to the effects of solar radiation and the outstreaming solar wind plasma acting upon the nucleus of the comet. Comet nuclei range from a few hundred meters to tens of kilometers across and are composed of loose collections of ice, dust, and small rocky particles. The coma may be up to 15 times Earth's diameter, while the tail may stretch beyond one astronomical unit. If sufficiently close and bright, a comet may be seen from Earth without the aid of a telescope and can subtend an arc of up to 30° (60 Moons) across the sky. Comets have been observed and recorded since ancient times by many cultures and religions.

Comets usually have highly eccentric elliptical orbits, and they have a wide range of orbital periods, ranging from several years to potentially several millions of years. Short-period comets originate in the Kuiper belt or its associated scattered disc, which lie beyond the orbit of Neptune. Long-period comets are thought to originate in the Oort cloud, a spherical cloud of icy bodies extending from outside the Kuiper belt to halfway to the nearest star. Long-period comets are set in motion towards the Sun by gravitational perturbations from passing stars and the galactic tide. Hyperbolic comets may pass once through the inner Solar System before being flung to interstellar space. The appearance of a comet is called an apparition.

Comets differ from asteroids. Comets contain volatile material that sublimate as they approach the Sun to produce the characteristic tail, but asteroids are more like rocks and form no tail. Asteroids are thought to have a different origin from comets, having formed inside the orbit of Jupiter rather than in the outer Solar System. However, the discovery of main-belt comets and active centaur minor planets has blurred the distinction between asteroids and comets. In the early 21st century, the discovery of some minor bodies with long-period comet orbits, but characteristics of inner solar system asteroids, were called Manx comets. They are still classified as comets, such as C/2014 S3 (PANSTARRS). Twenty-seven Manx comets were found from 2013 to 2017.

As of November 2021, there are 4,584 known comets. However, this represents a very small fraction of the total potential comet population, as the reservoir of comet-like bodies in the outer Solar System (in the Oort cloud) is about one trillion. Roughly one comet per year is visible to the naked eye, though many of those are faint and unspectacular. Particularly bright examples are called "great comets". Comets have been visited by uncrewed probes such as NASA's Deep Impact, which blasted a crater on Comet Tempel 1 to study its interior, and the European Space Agency's Rosetta, which became the first to land a robotic spacecraft on a comet.

== Etymology ==
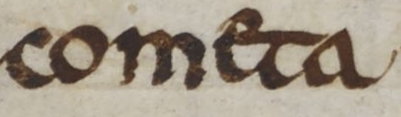
A comet was mentioned in the Anglo-Saxon Chronicle and by the Venerable Bede in the year 729 CE.

The word comet derives from the Old English cometa from the Latin comēta or comētēs. That, in turn, is a romanization of the Greek κομήτης 'wearing long hair', and the Oxford English Dictionary notes that the term (ἀστὴρ) κομήτης already meant 'long-haired star, comet' in Greek. Κομήτης was derived from κομᾶν (koman) 'to wear the hair long', which was itself derived from κόμη (komē) 'the hair of the head' and was used to mean 'the tail of a comet'.

The astronomical symbol for comets (represented in Unicode) is U+2604 ☄ COMET, consisting of a small disc with three hairlike extensions.

== Physical characteristics ==
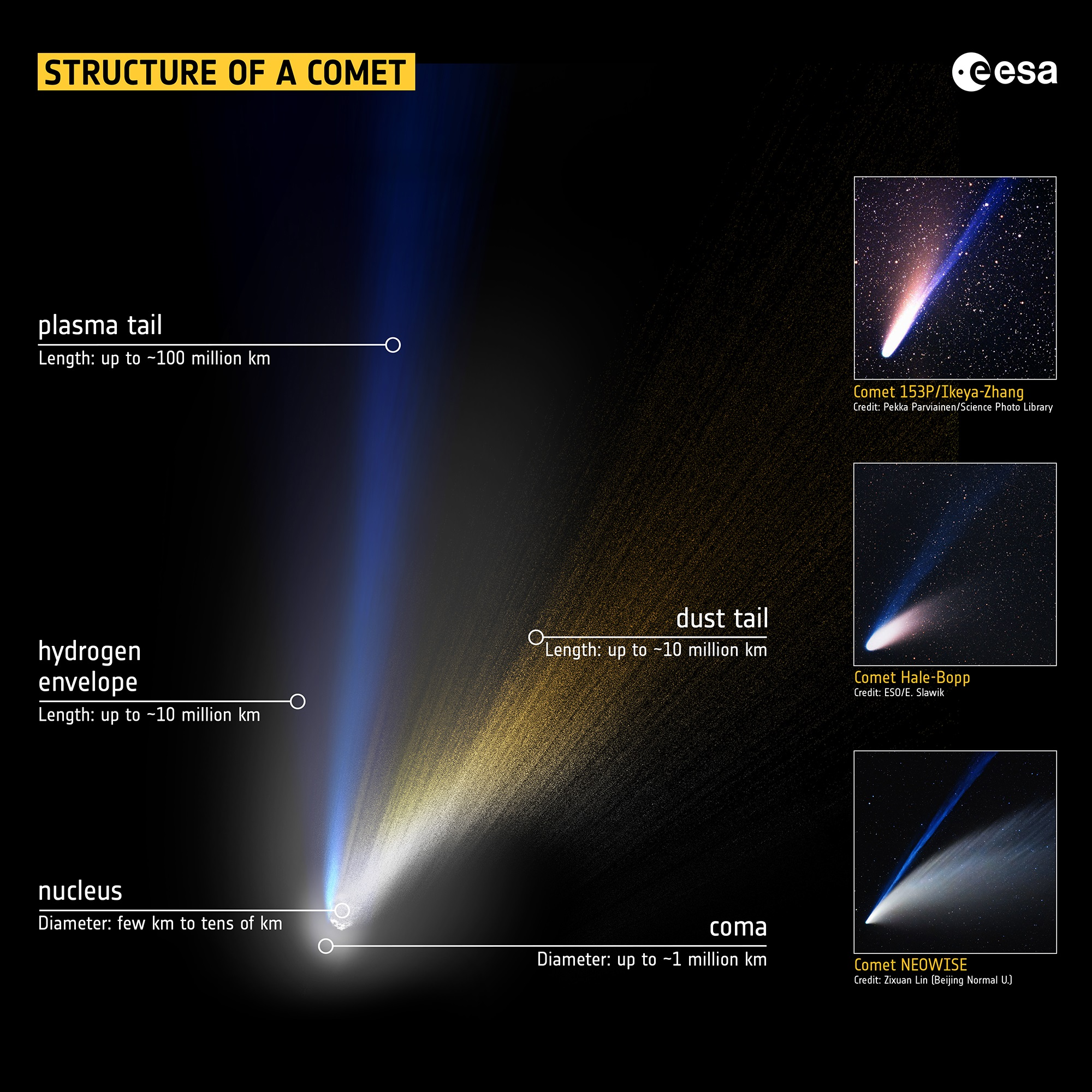
Structure of a comet

=== Nucleus ===
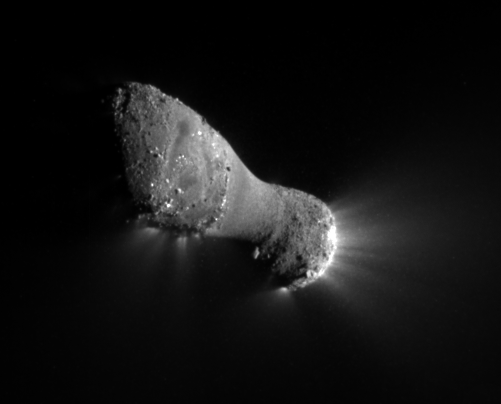
Nucleus of 103P/Hartley as imaged during a spacecraft flyby. The nucleus is about 2 km in length.

The solid, core structure of a comet is known as the nucleus. Cometary nuclei are composed of an amalgamation of rock, dust, water ice, and frozen carbon dioxide, carbon monoxide, methane, and ammonia. As such, they are popularly described as "dirty snowballs" after Fred Whipple's model. However after observation of Comet 9P/Tempel 1 collision with an "impactor" probe sent by NASA Deep Impact mission in July 2005, "icy dirtballs" may be more appropriate. Research conducted in 2014 suggests that comets are like "deep fried ice cream", in that their surfaces are formed of dense crystalline ice mixed with organic compounds, while the interior ice is colder and less dense.

The surface of the nucleus is generally dry, dusty or rocky, suggesting that the ices are hidden beneath a surface crust several metres thick. Nuclei contain a variety of organic compounds, which may include methanol, hydrogen cyanide, formaldehyde, ethanol, ethane, and perhaps more complex molecules such as long-chain hydrocarbons and amino acids. In 2009, it was confirmed that the amino acid glycine had been found in the comet dust recovered by NASA's Stardust mission. In August 2011, a report, based on NASA studies of meteorites found on Earth, was published suggesting DNA and RNA components (adenine, guanine, and related organic molecules) may have been formed on asteroids and comets.

The outer surfaces of cometary nuclei have a very low albedo, making them among the least reflective objects found in the Solar System. The Giotto space probe found that the nucleus of Halley's Comet (1P/Halley) reflects about four percent of the light that falls on it, and Deep Space 1 discovered that Comet Borrelly's surface reflects less than 3.0%; by comparison, asphalt reflects seven percent. The dark surface material of the nucleus may consist of complex organic compounds. Solar heating drives off lighter volatile compounds, leaving behind larger organic compounds that tend to be very dark, like tar or crude oil. The low reflectivity of cometary surfaces causes them to absorb the heat that drives their outgassing processes.

Long period comets tend to be of larger size compared to short period ones, usually 4-20 km in diameter. Short period comets are mostly 1.5 to 5 km in size. Comet nuclei with radii of up to 30 kilometers (19 mi) have been observed, but ascertaining their exact size is difficult. The nucleus of 322P/SOHO is probably only 100–200 meters (330–660 ft) in diameter. A lack of smaller comets being detected despite the increased sensitivity of instruments has led some to suggest that there is a real lack of comets smaller than 100 meters (330 ft) across. Known comets have been estimated to have an average density of 0.6 g/cm^{3} (0.35 oz/cu in). Because of their low mass, comet nuclei do not become spherical under their own gravity and therefore have irregular shapes.

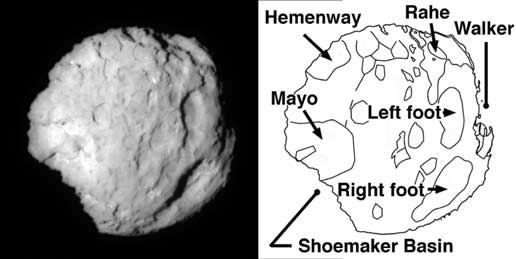
Comet 81P/Wild exhibits jets on light side and dark side, stark relief, and is dry.

Results from the Rosetta and Philae spacecraft show that the nucleus of 67P/Churyumov–Gerasimenko has no magnetic field, which suggests that magnetism may not have played a role in the early formation of planetesimals. Further, the ALICE spectrograph on Rosetta determined that electrons (within 1 km (0.62 mi) above the comet nucleus) produced from photoionization of water molecules by solar radiation, and not photons from the Sun as thought earlier, are responsible for the degradation of water and carbon dioxide molecules released from the comet nucleus into its coma. Instruments on the Philae lander found at least sixteen organic compounds at the comet's surface, four of which (acetamide, acetone, methyl isocyanate and propionaldehyde) have been detected for the first time on a comet.

Properties of some comets
Name	Dimensions (km)	Density (g/cm^{3})	Mass (kg)	Refs
Halley's Comet	15 × 8 × 8	0.6	3×10^{14}	
Tempel 1	7.6 × 4.9	0.62	7.9×10^{13}	
19P/Borrelly	8 × 4 × 4	0.3	2.0×10^{13}	
81P/Wild	5.5 × 4.0 × 3.3	0.6	2.3×10^{13}	
67P/Churyumov–Gerasimenko	4.1 × 3.3 × 1.8	0.47	1.0×10^{13}	

=== Coma ===
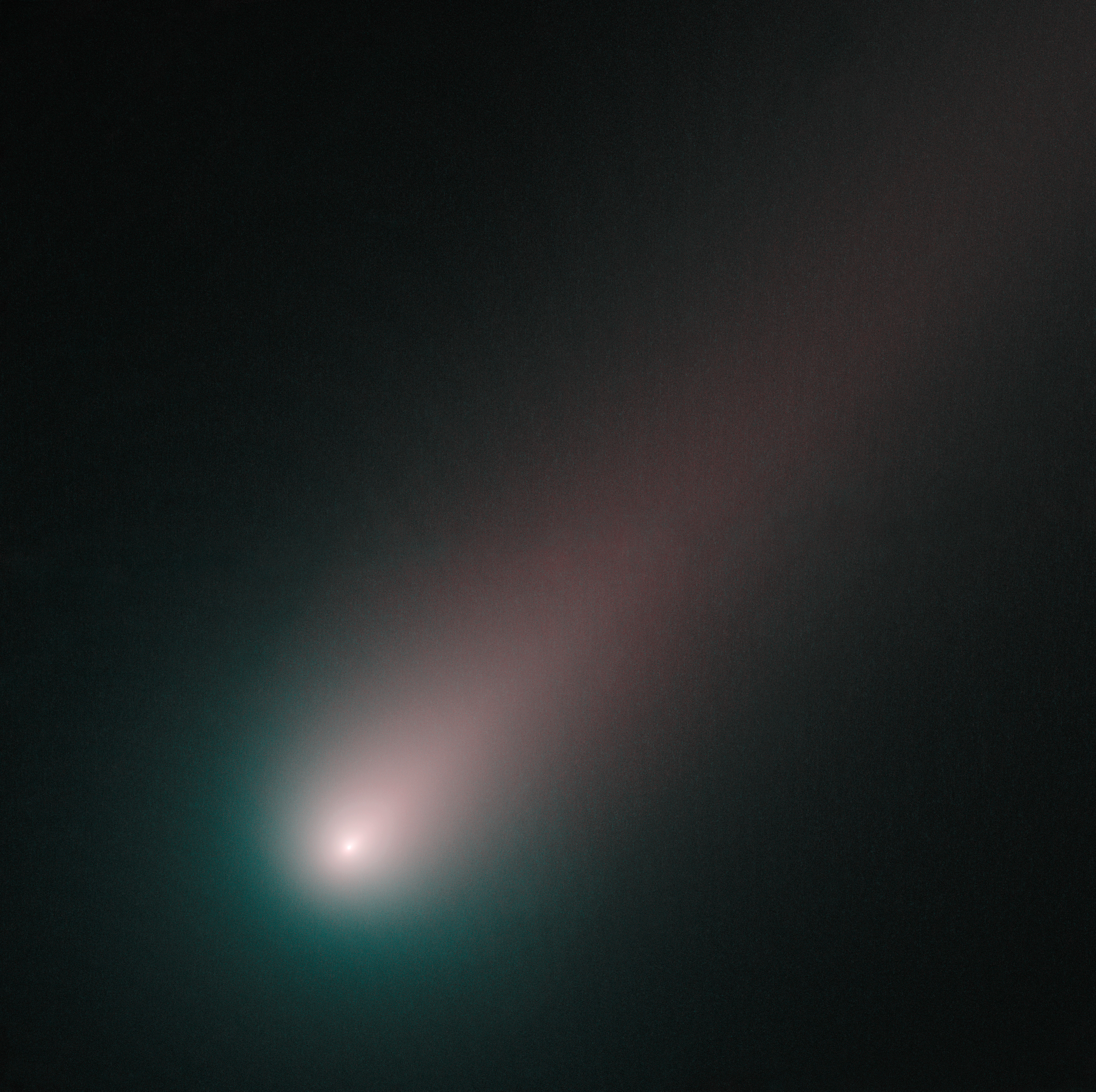
Hubble image of Comet ISON shortly before perihelion.

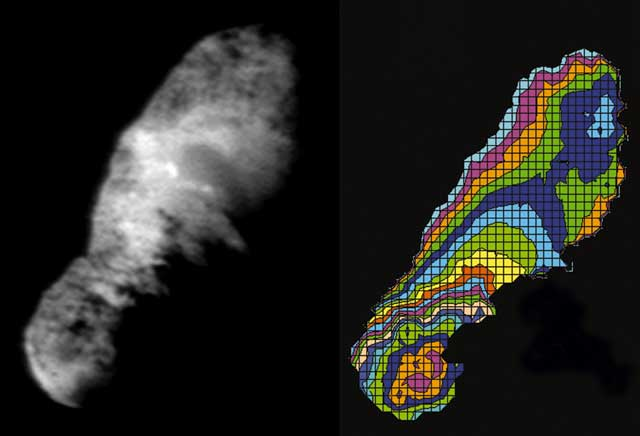
Comet Borrelly exhibits jets, but has no surface ice.

The streams of dust and gas thus released form a huge and extremely thin atmosphere around the comet called the "coma". The force exerted on the coma by the Sun's radiation pressure and solar wind cause an enormous "tail" to form pointing away from the Sun.

The coma is generally made of water and dust, with water making up to 90% of the volatiles that outflow from the nucleus when the comet is within 3 to 4 AU (450 to 600 million km; 280 to 370 million mi) of the Sun. The H_{2}O parent molecule is destroyed primarily through photodissociation and to a much lesser extent photoionization, with the solar wind playing a minor role in the destruction of water compared to photochemistry. Larger dust particles are left along the comet's orbital path whereas smaller particles are pushed away from the Sun into the comet's tail by light pressure.

Although the solid nucleus of comets is generally less than 60 kilometers (37 mi) across, the coma may be thousands or millions of kilometers across. Occasionally a comet may experience a huge and sudden outburst of gas and dust, during which the size of the coma greatly increases for a period of time. For example, about a month after an outburst in October 2007, comet 17P/Holmes briefly had a tenuous dust atmosphere larger than the Sun. The Great Comet of 1811 had a coma roughly the diameter of the Sun. Even though the coma can become quite large, its size can decrease about the time it crosses the orbit of Mars around 1.5 AU (220 million km; 140 million mi) from the Sun. At this distance the solar wind becomes strong enough to blow the gas and dust away from the coma, and in doing so enlarging the tail.

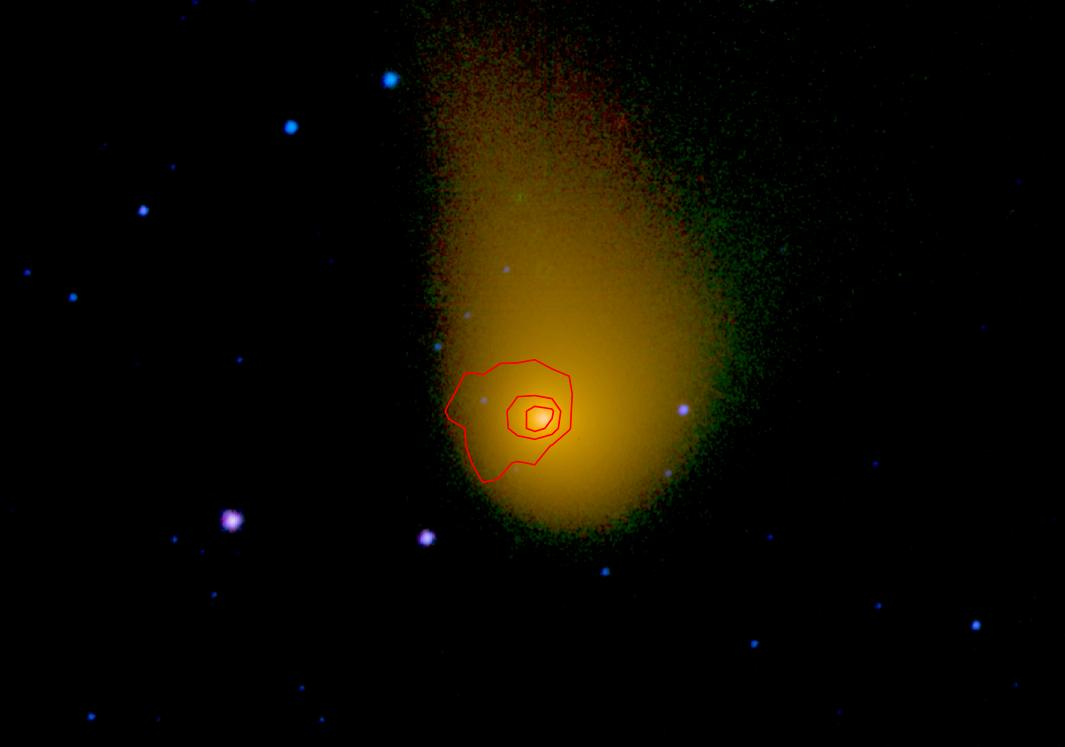
C/2006 W3 (Christensen) emitting carbon gas (IR image)

In 1996, comets were found to emit X-rays. This greatly surprised astronomers because X-ray emission is usually associated with very high-temperature bodies. Thomas E. Cravens was the first to propose an explanation in early 1997. The X-rays are generated by the interaction between comets and the solar wind: when highly charged solar wind ions fly through a cometary atmosphere, they collide with cometary atoms and molecules, "stealing" one or more electrons from the atom in a process called "charge exchange". This exchange or transfer of an electron to the solar wind ion is followed by its de-excitation into the ground state of the ion by the emission of X-rays and far ultraviolet photons.

=== Bow shock ===
As a comet approaches the Sun, UV light ionizes gases in the coma. When the solar wind interacts with these ionized particles, mainly OH and CO group molecules, the solar wind plasma is decelerated in a large region around the comet: a cometary-mode bow shock forms.

The cometary bow shock resembles the classical bow shock observed when a planetary magnetic field, like that around Earth, Jupiter, Saturn, or Neptune, interacts with the solar wind. However comets have no magnetic field. Like Mars and Venus, comets are said to have an induced magnetosphere.

=== Tails ===
Typical direction of tails during a comet's orbit near the Sun

Diagram of a comet showing the dust trail, the dust tail, and the ion gas tail formed by solar wind

A comet may have a dust tail, an ion tail, both or neither. The dust and ion tails both begin when sunlight vaporizes material from the comet. The dust tail contains particle about the size of human hairs. Radiation pressure from the Sun pushes these dust particles away, resulting in a gentle arc shape. Larger particles, the size of pebbles, are pulled towards the Sun, staying on the orbit of the comet. The ion tail contains molecule sized particles ionized by the Sun then captured by the magnetic field created by the interaction between these ions and the solar wind. The ion tail points directly away from the Sun following magnetic field lines. On occasions—such as when Earth passes through a comet's orbital plane, the antitail, pointing in the opposite direction to the ion and dust tails, may be seen.

=== Jets ===
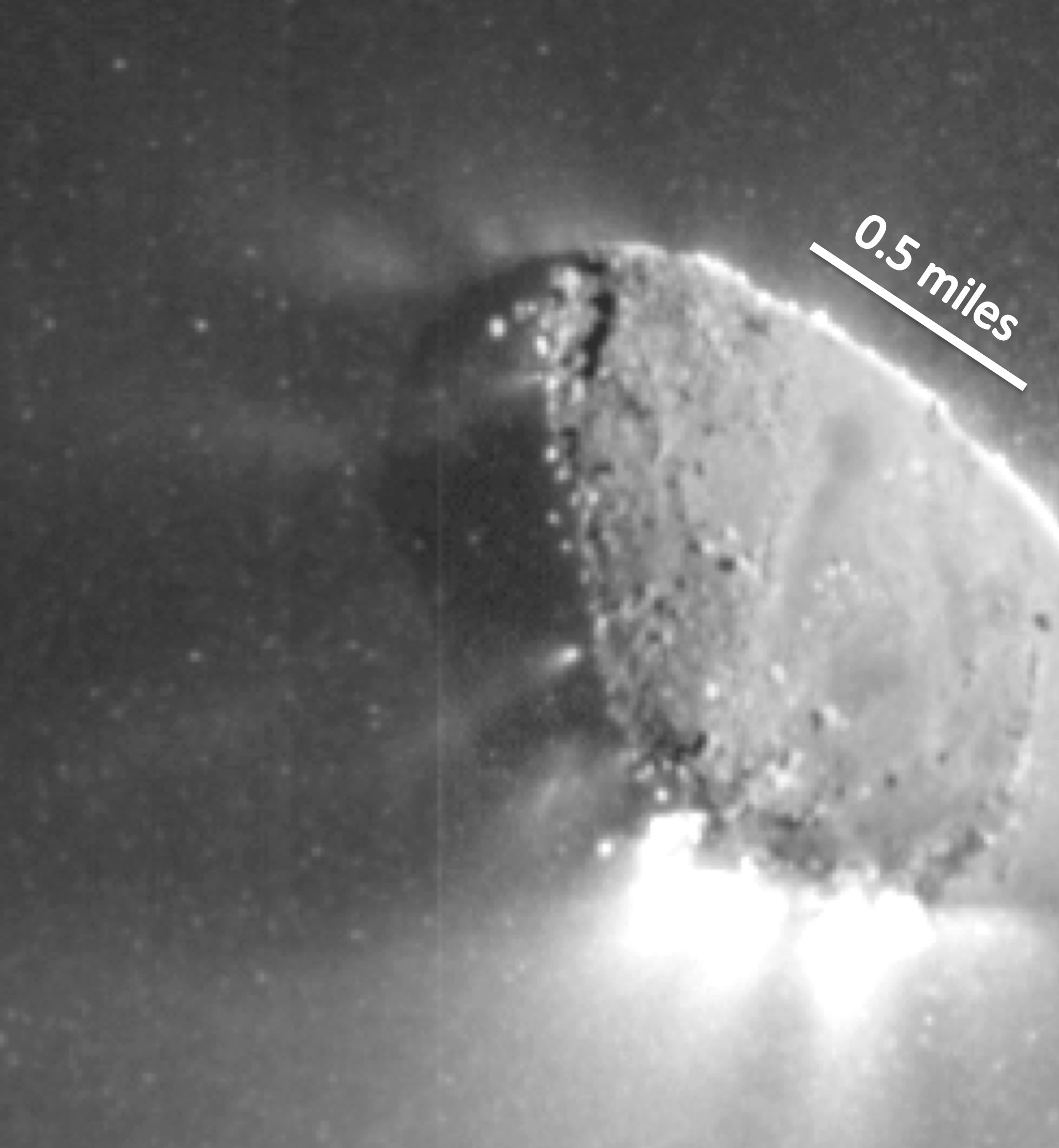
Gas and snow jets of 103P/Hartley

Uneven heating can cause newly generated gases to break out of a weak spot on the surface of comet's nucleus, like a geyser. These streams of gas and dust can cause the nucleus to spin, and even split apart. In 2010 it was revealed that sublimation of dry ice (frozen carbon dioxide) can power jets of material flowing out of a comet nucleus. Infrared imaging of Hartley 2 shows such jets exiting and carrying with it dust grains into the coma.

== Orbital characteristics ==
Most comets are small Solar System bodies with elongated elliptical orbits that take them close to the Sun for a part of their orbit and then out into the further reaches of the Solar System for the remainder. Technically, these objects have a perihelion, their nearest point to the Sun of less than 4 AU, that is controlled by the gravity of Jupiter and not controlled by the gravity of another planet near the perihelion. Comets can be subdivided according to their aphelion distance, how far away from the Sun they can orbit. The four subdivisions, E for Encke, SP for short-period, I for intermediate, and L for long-period, have names derived from an earlier classification based on the length of their orbital periods.

Single-apparition or non-periodic comets have parabolic or hyperbolic trajectories. The low mass and elliptical orbits cause comet orbits to be altered by gravitational forces from giant planets and these single-apparition comets orbit the Sun one time then permanently exit the Solar System.

=== Encke-type comet ===
At the shorter orbital period extreme, Encke's Comet has an orbit that does not reach the orbit of Jupiter, and is known as an Encke-type comet. They have aphelion less than 4 AU. Short-period comets with orbital periods less than 20 years and low inclinations (up to 30 degrees) to the ecliptic are called traditional Jupiter-family comets (JFCs). Those like Halley, with orbital periods of between 20 and 200 years and inclinations extending from zero to more than 90 degrees, are called Halley-type comets (HTCs). As of October 2026 there are 80 known Encke-type comets (six of which are classified as near-Earth objects (NEOs)), 112 HTCs (37 of which are NEOs), and 831 JFCs (155 of which are NEOs).

Recently discovered main-belt comets form a distinct class, orbiting in more circular orbits within the asteroid belt.

=== Short period ===
Periodic comets or short-period comets are generally defined as those having orbital periods of less than 200 years. They usually orbit more-or-less in the ecliptic plane in the same direction as the planets. They have aphelion 4–35 AU. Their orbits typically take them out to the region of the outer planets (Jupiter and beyond) at aphelion; for example, the aphelion of Halley's Comet is a little beyond the orbit of Neptune. Comets whose aphelia are near a major planet's orbit are called its "family". Such families are thought to arise from the planet capturing formerly long-period comets into shorter orbits.

Because their elliptical orbits frequently take them close to the giant planets, comets are subject to further gravitational perturbations. Short-period comets have a tendency for their aphelia to coincide with a giant planet's semi-major axis, with the JFCs being the largest group. It is clear that comets coming in from the Oort cloud often have their orbits strongly influenced by the gravity of giant planets as a result of a close encounter. Jupiter is the source of the greatest perturbations, being more than twice as massive as all the other planets combined. These perturbations can deflect long-period comets into shorter orbital periods.

Based on their orbital characteristics, short-period comets are thought to originate from the centaurs and the Kuiper belt/scattered disc —a disk of objects in the trans-Neptunian region—whereas the source of long-period comets is thought to be the far more distant spherical Oort cloud (after the Dutch astronomer Jan Hendrik Oort who hypothesized its existence). Vast swarms of comet-like bodies are thought to orbit the Sun in these distant regions in roughly circular orbits. Occasionally the gravitational influence of the outer planets (in the case of Kuiper belt objects) or nearby stars (in the case of Oort cloud objects) may throw one of these bodies into an elliptical orbit that takes it inwards toward the Sun to form a visible comet. Unlike the return of periodic comets, whose orbits have been established by previous observations, the appearance of new comets by this mechanism is unpredictable. When flung into the orbit of the sun, and being continuously dragged towards it, tons of matter are stripped from the comets which greatly influence their lifetime; the more stripped, the shorter they live and vice versa.

=== Intermediate period ===
Comets with periods greater than 30 years but less than 200 years have been called intermediate period comets, but other definitions have been used. They can be considered to have aphelion 35–1000 AU.

=== Long period ===
Orbits of Comet Kohoutek (red) and Earth (blue), illustrating the high eccentricity of its orbit and its rapid motion when close to the Sun

Long-period comets have highly eccentric orbits and periods ranging from 200 years to thousands or even millions of years. They have aphelion greater than 1000 AU. Less than a dozen of such comets are observed annually, but studying them is important as a way to learn more about the Oort cloud where they primarily originate. Jan Oort himself discovered the key facts about these comets including their nearly parabolic orbits oriented randomly around the Sun. Subsequent studies showed that galactic tides and the gravitational push of passing stars are sufficient to create a comet from objects in the Oort cloud. About half of these comets are ejected from the Solar System on their first pass by the Sun due to the gravity of the planets. As long-period comets approach the Sun their orbital eccentricity oscillates in sync with the orbit of Jupiter and falls as the comet passes the orbit of Uranus.

As of 2025, three objects have been discovered with an eccentricity significantly greater than one: 1I/ʻOumuamua, 2I/Borisov, and 3I/ATLAS, indicating an origin outside the Solar System. While ʻOumuamua, with an eccentricity of about 1.2, showed no optical signs of cometary activity during its passage through the inner Solar System in October 2017, changes to its trajectory—which suggests outgassing—indicate that it is probably a comet. On the other hand, 2I/Borisov, with an estimated eccentricity of about 3.36, has been observed to have the coma feature of comets, and is considered the first detected interstellar comet. 3I/ATLAS has an eccentricity of about 6.1, and also has a coma, indicating that it is also a comet. Comet C/1980 E1 had an orbital period of roughly 7.1 million years before the 1982 perihelion passage, but a 1980 encounter with Jupiter accelerated the comet giving it the largest eccentricity (1.057) of any known solar comet with a reasonable observation arc.

Early observations have revealed a few genuinely hyperbolic (i.e. non-periodic) trajectories, but no more than could be accounted for by perturbations from Jupiter. Comets from interstellar space are moving with velocities of the same order as the relative velocities of stars near the Sun (a few tens of km per second). When such objects enter the Solar System, they have a positive specific orbital energy resulting in a positive velocity at infinity ($v_{\infty}\!$) and have notably hyperbolic trajectories. A rough calculation shows that there might be four hyperbolic comets per century within Jupiter's orbit, give or take one and perhaps two orders of magnitude. As of 2026, 520 comets with hyperbolic, and 1763 comets with parabolic, trajectories have been observed.

=== Exocomets ===
Exocomets beyond the Solar System have been detected and may be common in the Milky Way. The first exocomet system detected was around Beta Pictoris, a very young A-type main-sequence star, in 1987. A total of 11 such exocomet systems have been identified as of 2013, using the absorption spectrum caused by the large clouds of gas emitted by comets when passing close to their star. For ten years the Kepler space telescope was responsible for searching for planets and other forms outside of the solar system. The first transiting exocomets were found in February 2018 by a group consisting of professional astronomers and citizen scientists in light curves recorded by the Kepler Space Telescope. After Kepler Space Telescope retired in October 2018, a new telescope called TESS Telescope has taken over Kepler's mission. Since the launch of TESS, astronomers have discovered the transits of comets around the star Beta Pictoris using a light curve from TESS. Since TESS has taken over, astronomers have since been able to better distinguish exocomets with the spectroscopic method. New planets are detected by the white light curve method which is viewed as a symmetrical dip in the charts readings when a planet overshadows its parent star. However, after further evaluation of these light curves, it has been discovered that the asymmetrical patterns of the dips presented are caused by the tail of a comet or of hundreds of comets.

== Effects of comets ==
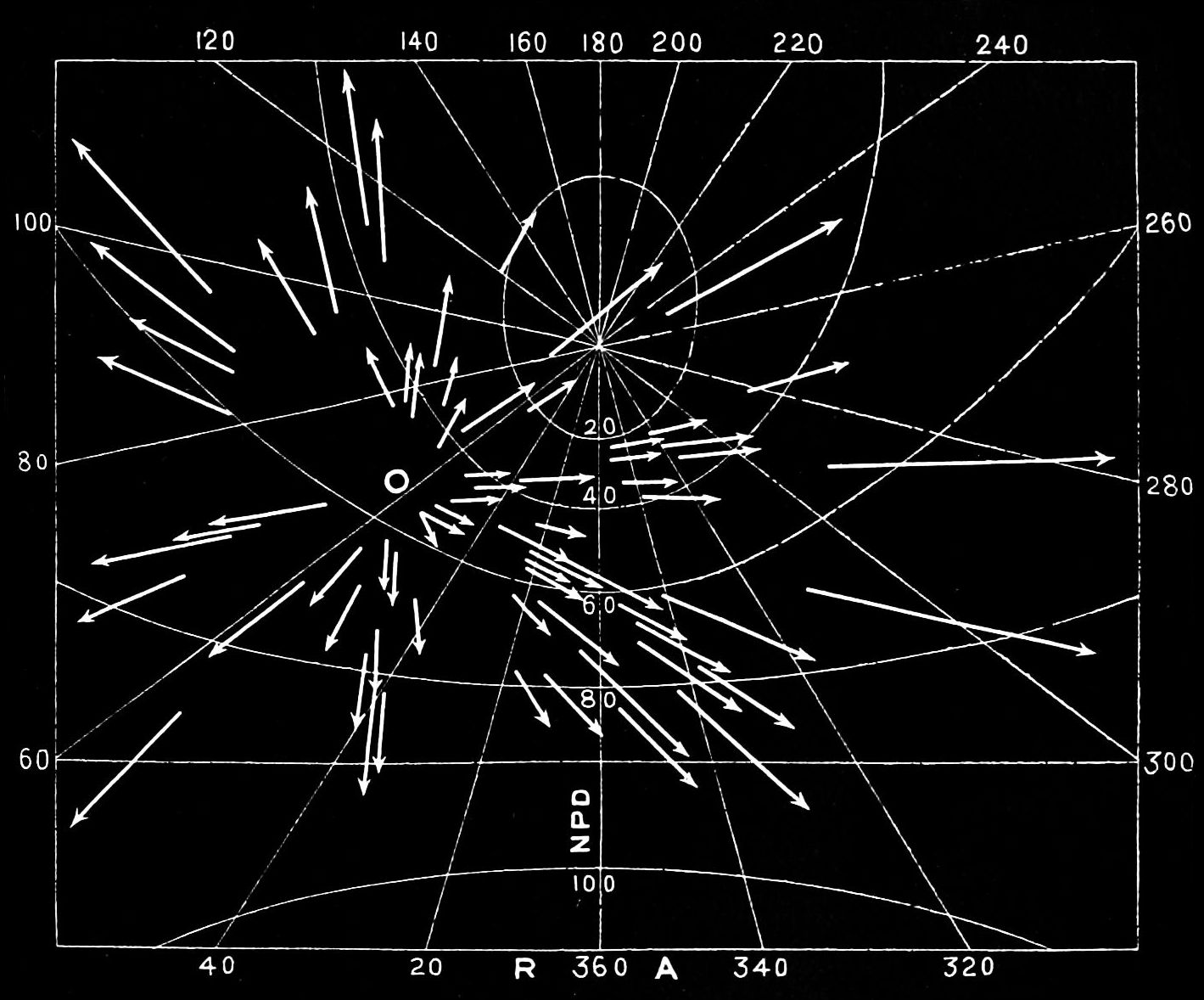
Diagram of Perseid meteors

=== Connection to meteor showers ===
As a comet is heated during close passes to the Sun, outgassing of its icy components releases solid debris too large to be swept away by radiation pressure and the solar wind. If Earth's orbit sends it through that trail of debris, which is composed mostly of fine grains of rocky material, there is likely to be a meteor shower as Earth passes through. Denser trails of debris produce quick but intense meteor showers and less dense trails create longer but less intense showers. Typically, the density of the debris trail is related to how long ago the parent comet released the material. The Perseid meteor shower, for example, occurs every year between 9 and 13 August, when Earth passes through the orbit of Comet Swift–Tuttle. Halley's Comet is the source of the Orionid shower in October.

=== Comets and impact on life ===
Many comets and asteroids collided with Earth in its early stages. Many scientists think that comets bombarding the young Earth about 4 billion years ago brought the vast quantities of water that now fill Earth's oceans, or at least a significant portion of it. Others have cast doubt on this idea. The detection of organic molecules, including polycyclic aromatic hydrocarbons, in significant quantities in comets has led to speculation that comets or meteorites may have brought the precursors of life—or even life itself—to Earth. In 2013 it was suggested that impacts between rocky and icy surfaces, such as comets, had the potential to create the amino acids that make up proteins through shock synthesis. The speed at which the comets entered the atmosphere, combined with the magnitude of energy created after initial contact, allowed smaller molecules to condense into the larger macro-molecules that served as the foundation for life. In 2015, scientists found significant amounts of molecular oxygen in the outgassings of comet 67P, suggesting that the molecule may occur more often than had been thought, and thus less an indicator of life as has been supposed.

It is suspected that comet impacts have, over long timescales, delivered significant quantities of water to Earth's Moon, some of which may have survived as lunar ice. Comet and meteoroid impacts are thought to be responsible for the existence of tektites and australites.

=== Fear of comets ===
Fear of comets as acts of God and signs of impending doom was highest in Europe from 1200 to 1650 CE. The year after the Great Comet of 1618, for example, Gotthard Arthusius published a pamphlet stating that it was a sign that the Day of Judgment was near. He listed ten pages of comet-related disasters, including "earthquakes, floods, changes in river courses, hail storms, hot and dry weather, poor harvests, epidemics, war and treason and high prices".

By 1700 most scholars concluded that such events occurred whether a comet was seen or not. Using Edmond Halley's records of comet sightings, however, William Whiston in 1711 wrote that the Great Comet of 1680 had a periodicity of 574 years and was responsible for the worldwide flood in the Book of Genesis, by pouring water on Earth. His announcement revived for another century fear of comets, now as direct threats to the world instead of signs of disasters. Spectroscopic analysis in 1910 found the toxic gas cyanogen in the tail of Halley's Comet, causing panicked buying of gas masks and quack "anti-comet pills" and "anti-comet umbrellas" by the public.

== Formation ==
Comets are believed to represent condensed material from the Solar Nebula, the gas cloud that also lead to the formation of the planets. Two models have been proposed to explain how micron sized dust and ice aggregates to form the nuclei of a comet. One model expects pairs of small particles to stick together upon collision, growing larger each time. Models of this process work up to about one meter, but comet nuclei are much larger. The second model starts the same way, but at 1 cm, the size of pebbles, the model proposes that hydrodynamic streaming organizes the pebbles as they coalesce gravitationally. This model is unable to explain how the ball of pebbles can remain cold and fragmentary under internal heat from radionuclide decay and pressure from gravity.

As the small particles grew, the Solar Nebula evolved and dispersed as the orbits of giant planets changed. The dispersal lead to groups of objects in the Kuiper belt, the Scattered disk, the Oort cloud, as well as objects called Trojans trapped around Jupiter and Neptune. These distant regions act as cold storage: 40 K for the Kuiper belt and Scattered disk around 35–100 AU, 10 K for the Oort cloud out beyond 3×10^{3} AU.

== Reservoirs ==
Active, visible comets are on unstable orbits: they last a few hundred thousand years. Inactive comets orbit far from the Sun in several different named areas.

=== Oort cloud ===
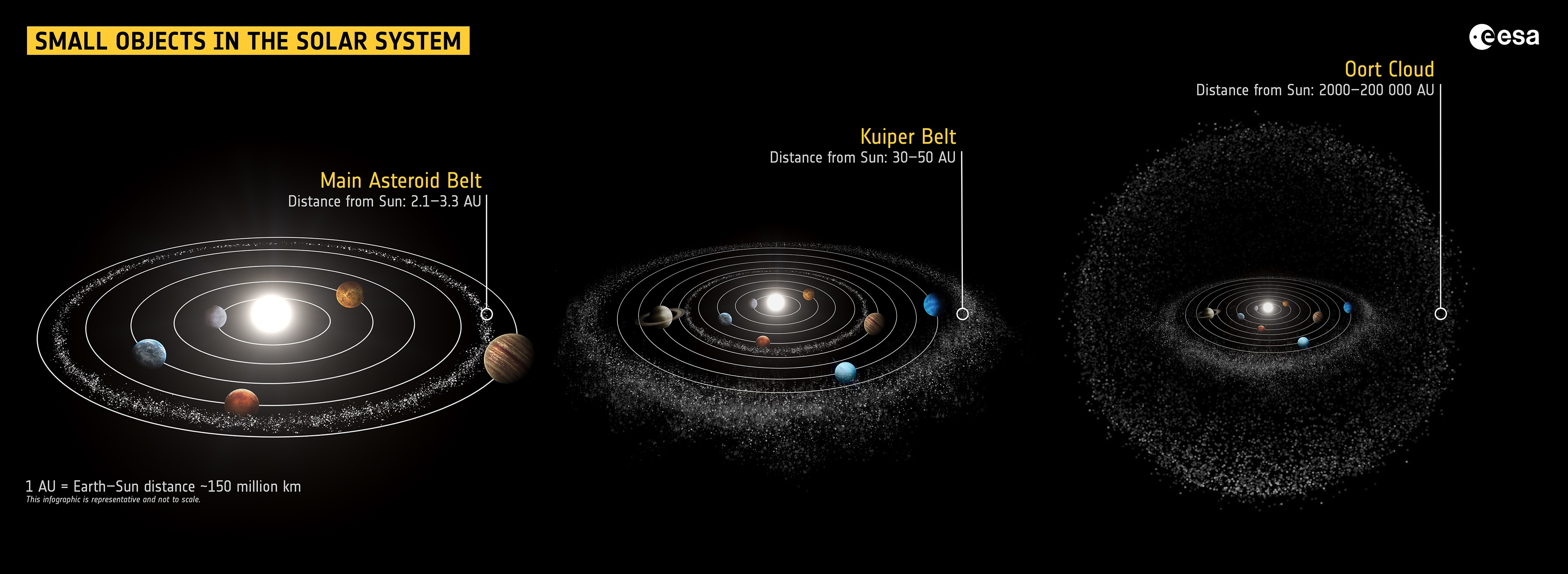
The Oort cloud thought to surround the Solar System. Showed with Kuiper Belt and Asteroid Belt for comparison.

The Oort cloud occupies a vast space starting from between 2,000 and 5,000 AU (0.03 and 0.08 ly). to as far as 50,000 AU (0.79 ly) from the Sun. (Some estimates place the outer edge at between 100,000 and 200,000 AU (1.58 and 3.16 ly).) The cloud's icy chunks are thought to be leftover material from the formation of the planets. These chunks were ejected from the region around the Sun by the gravitational force of the planets, especially Jupiter.

The region can be subdivided into a spherical outer Oort cloud of 20,000–50,000 AU (0.32–0.79 ly), and a doughnut-shaped inner cloud, the Hills cloud, of 2,000–20,000 AU (0.03–0.32 ly). The outer cloud is only weakly bound to the Sun and supplies the long-period (and possibly Halley-type) comets that fall to inside the orbit of Neptune. The inner Oort cloud is also known as the Hills cloud, named after Jack G. Hills, who proposed its existence in 1981. Models predict that the inner cloud should have tens or hundreds of times as many cometary nuclei as the outer halo; it is seen as a possible source of new comets that resupply the relatively tenuous outer cloud as the latter's numbers are gradually depleted.

=== Kuiper Belt ===
Closer towards the Sun, the Kuiper Belt is another reservoir of inactive comets.

== Fate ==
The most common fate for a comet is ejection from the solar system, followed by random disintegration, tidal disruptions, loss of volatiles on the surface, and collision with large bodies in the Solar System.

=== Departure (ejection) from Solar System ===
If a comet is traveling fast enough, it may leave the Solar System. Such comets follow the open path of a hyperbola, and as such, they are called hyperbolic comets. Solar comets are only known to be ejected by interacting with another object in the Solar System, such as Jupiter. An example of this is Comet C/1980 E1, which was shifted from an orbit of 7.1 million years around the Sun, to a hyperbolic trajectory, after a 1980 close pass by the planet Jupiter. Interstellar comets such as 1I/ʻOumuamua, 2I/Borisov and 3I/ATLAS never orbited the Sun and therefore do not require a 3rd-body interaction to be ejected from the Solar System.

=== Extinction ===
Dormant or extinct comets have lost their volatile surface material. Eventually most of the volatile material contained in a comet nucleus evaporates, and the comet becomes a small, dark, inert lump of rock or rubble that can resemble an asteroid. Since comet orbits are stable longer than the time scale for the comet to lose material, many such extinct comets are expected to exist in the Solar system.

Jupiter-family comets and long-period comets appear to follow very different fading laws. The JFCs are active over a lifetime of about 10,000 years or ~1,000 orbits whereas long-period comets fade much faster. Only 10% of the long-period comets survive more than 50 passages to small perihelion and only 1% of them survive more than 2,000 passages. Some asteroids in elliptical orbits are now identified as extinct comets. Roughly six percent of the near-Earth asteroids are thought to be extinct comet nuclei.

=== Breakup and collisions ===
The nucleus of some comets may be fragile, a conclusion supported by the observation of comets splitting apart. A significant cometary disruption was that of Comet Shoemaker–Levy 9, which was discovered in 1993. A close encounter in July 1992 had broken it into pieces, and over a period of six days in July 1994, these pieces fell into Jupiter's atmosphere—the first time astronomers had observed a collision between two objects in the Solar System. Other splitting comets include 3D/Biela in 1846 and 73P/Schwassmann–Wachmann from 1995 to 2006. Greek historian Ephorus reported that a comet split apart as far back as the winter of 372–373 BCE. Comets are suspected of splitting due to thermal stress, internal gas pressure, or impact.

Comets 42P/Neujmin and 53P/Van Biesbroeck appear to be fragments of a parent comet. Numerical integrations have shown that both comets had a rather close approach to Jupiter in January 1850, and that, before 1850, the two orbits were nearly identical. Another group of comets that is the result of fragmentation episodes is the Liller comet family made of C/1988 A1 (Liller), C/1996 Q1 (Tabur), C/2015 F3 (SWAN), C/2019 Y1 (ATLAS), and C/2023 V5 (Leonard).

Some comets have been observed to break up during their perihelion passage, including great comets West and Ikeya–Seki. Biela's Comet was one significant example when it broke into two pieces during its passage through the perihelion in 1846. These two comets were seen separately in 1852, but never again afterward. Instead, spectacular meteor showers were seen in 1872 and 1885 when the comet should have been visible. A minor meteor shower, the Andromedids, occurs annually in November, and it is caused when Earth crosses the orbit of Biela's Comet.

Some comets meet a more spectacular end – either falling into the Sun or colliding with a planet or other body. Collisions between comets and planets or moons were common in the early Solar System: some of the many craters on the Moon, for example, may have been caused by comets. A recent collision of a comet with a planet occurred in July 1994 when Comet Shoemaker–Levy 9 broke up into pieces and collided with Jupiter.

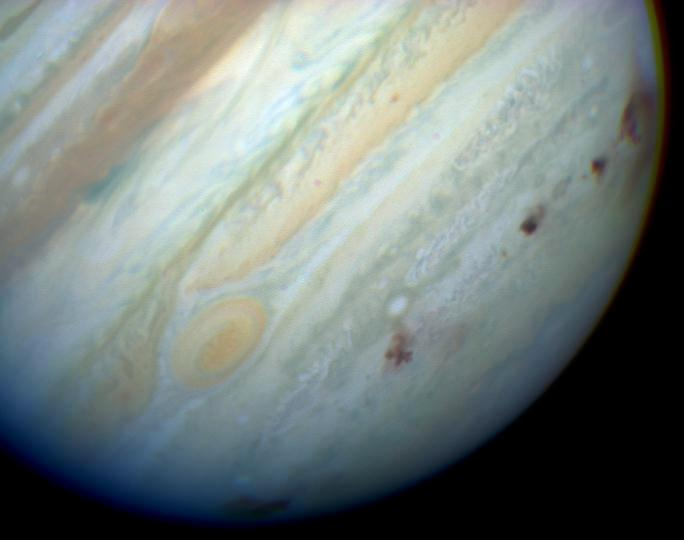
Brown spots mark impact sites of Comet Shoemaker–Levy 9 on Jupiter

The break up of 73P/Schwassmann–Wachmann within three days (1995)

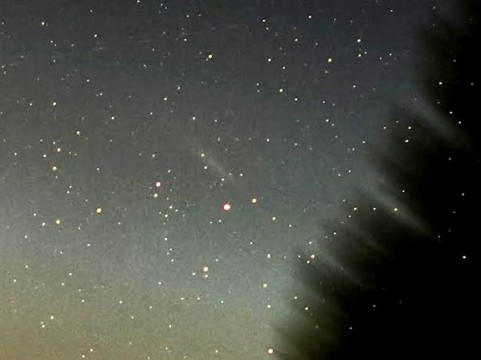
Ghost tail of C/2015 D1 (SOHO) after passage at the Sun

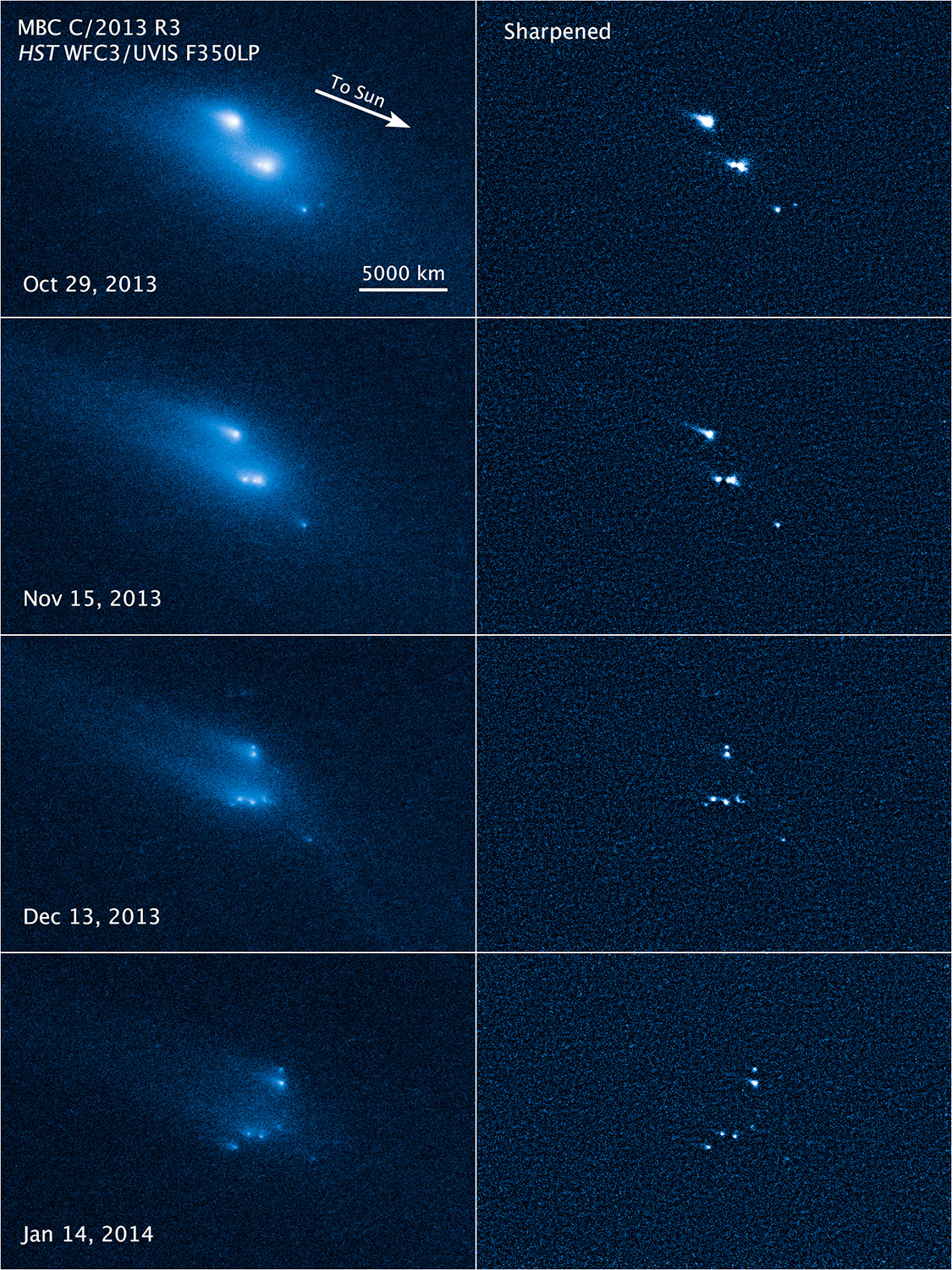
Disintegration of P/2013 R3 (2014)

== Nomenclature ==
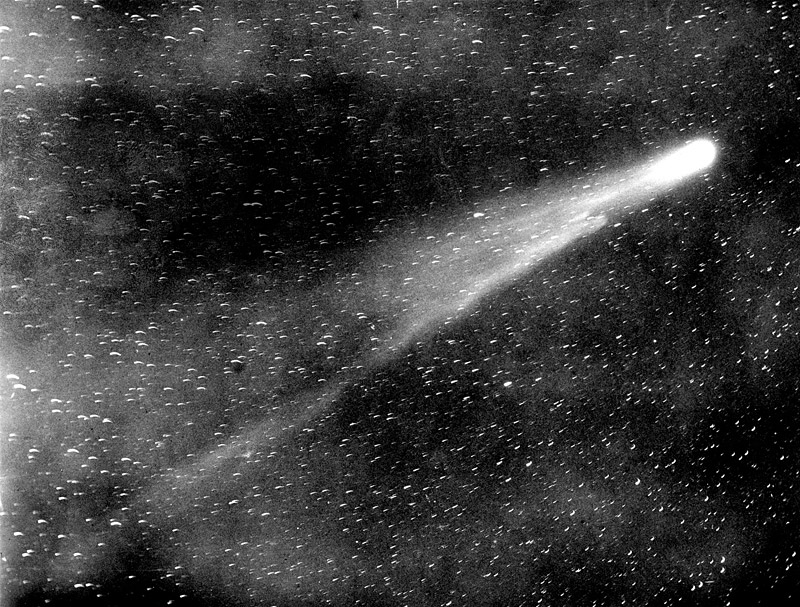
Halley's Comet in 1910

The first comet to be associated with an astronomer was Halley's Comet. Edmond Halley demonstrated that the comets of 1531, 1607, and 1682 were the same body and successfully predicted its return in 1759 by calculating its orbit. Similarly, the second and third known periodic comets, Encke's Comet and Biela's Comet, were named after the astronomers who calculated their orbits rather than their original discoverers. Later, periodic comets were usually named after their discoverers, but comets that had appeared only once continued to be referred to by the year of their appearance.

In 1995 a scheme for naming comets based on the minor planet designations was adopted by the International Astronomical Union. This scheme uses letters, for example C/ for single-apparition comets or P/ for periodic comets, followed by the year and a particularly formatted date. For example, in 2019, astronomer Gennadiy Borisov observed a comet that appeared to have originated outside of the solar system; the comet was named 2I/Borisov after him.

== History of study ==
=== Early observations and thought ===
From ancient sources, such as Chinese oracle bones, it is known that comets have been noticed by humans for millennia. Until the sixteenth century, comets were usually considered bad omens of deaths of kings or noble men, or coming catastrophes, or even interpreted as attacks by heavenly beings against terrestrial inhabitants.

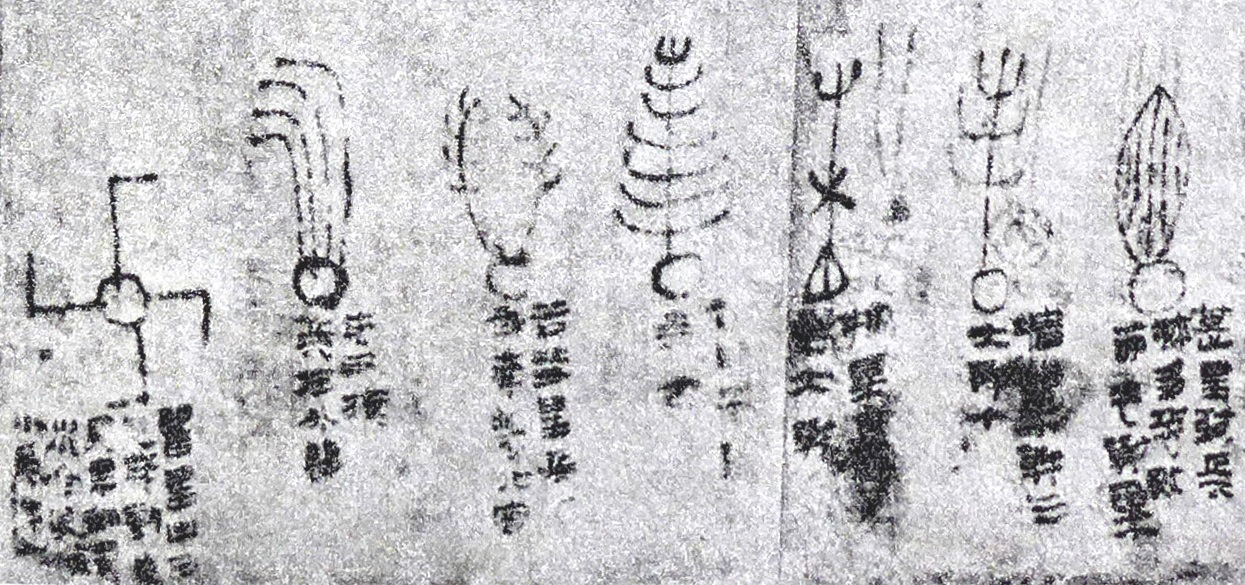
Detail of astrology manuscript, ink on silk, 2nd century BCE, Han dynasty, unearthed from Mawangdui tomb. The page gives descriptions and illustrations of seven comets, from a total of 29 found in the document (see: historical comet observations in China).

Aristotle (384–322 BCE) was the first known scientist to use various theories and observational facts to employ a consistent, structured cosmological theory of comets. He believed that comets were atmospheric phenomena, due to the fact that they could appear outside of the zodiac and vary in brightness over the course of a few days. Aristotle's cometary theory arose from his observations and cosmological theory that everything in the cosmos is arranged in a distinct configuration. Part of this configuration was a clear separation between the celestial and terrestrial, believing comets to be strictly associated with the latter. According to Aristotle, comets must be within the sphere of the moon and clearly separated from the heavens. Also in the 4th century BCE, Apollonius of Myndus supported the idea that comets moved like the planets. Aristotelian theory on comets continued to be widely accepted throughout the Middle Ages, despite several discoveries from various individuals challenging aspects of it.

In the 1st century CE, Seneca the Younger questioned Aristotle's logic concerning comets. Because of their regular movement and imperviousness to wind, they cannot be atmospheric, and are more permanent than suggested by their brief flashes across the sky. (Note: "I do not think that a comet is just a sudden fire, but that it is among the eternal works of nature." (Sagan & Druyan 1997, p. 26)) He pointed out that only the tails are transparent and thus cloudlike, and argued that there is no reason to confine their orbits to the zodiac. In criticizing Apollonius of Myndus, Seneca argues, "A comet cuts through the upper regions of the universe and then finally becomes visible when it reaches the lowest point of its orbit." While Seneca did not author a substantial theory of his own, his arguments would spark much debate among Aristotle's critics in the 16th and 17th centuries. (Note: Seneca is quoted as stating, "Why ... are we surprised that comets, such a rare spectacle in the universe, are not yet grasped by fixed laws and that their beginning and end are not known, when their return is at vast intervals? ... The time will come when diligent research over very long periods of time will bring to light things which now lie hidden.")

In the 1st century CE, Pliny the Elder believed that comets were connected with political unrest and death. Pliny observed comets as "human like", often describing their tails with "long hair" or "long beard". His system for classifying comets according to their color and shape was used for centuries.

In India, by the 6th century CE astronomers believed that comets were apparitions that re-appeared periodically. This was the view expressed in the 6th century by the astronomers Varāhamihira and Bhadrabahu, and the 10th-century astronomer Bhaṭṭotpala listed the names and estimated periods of certain comets, but it is not known how these figures were calculated or how accurate they were.

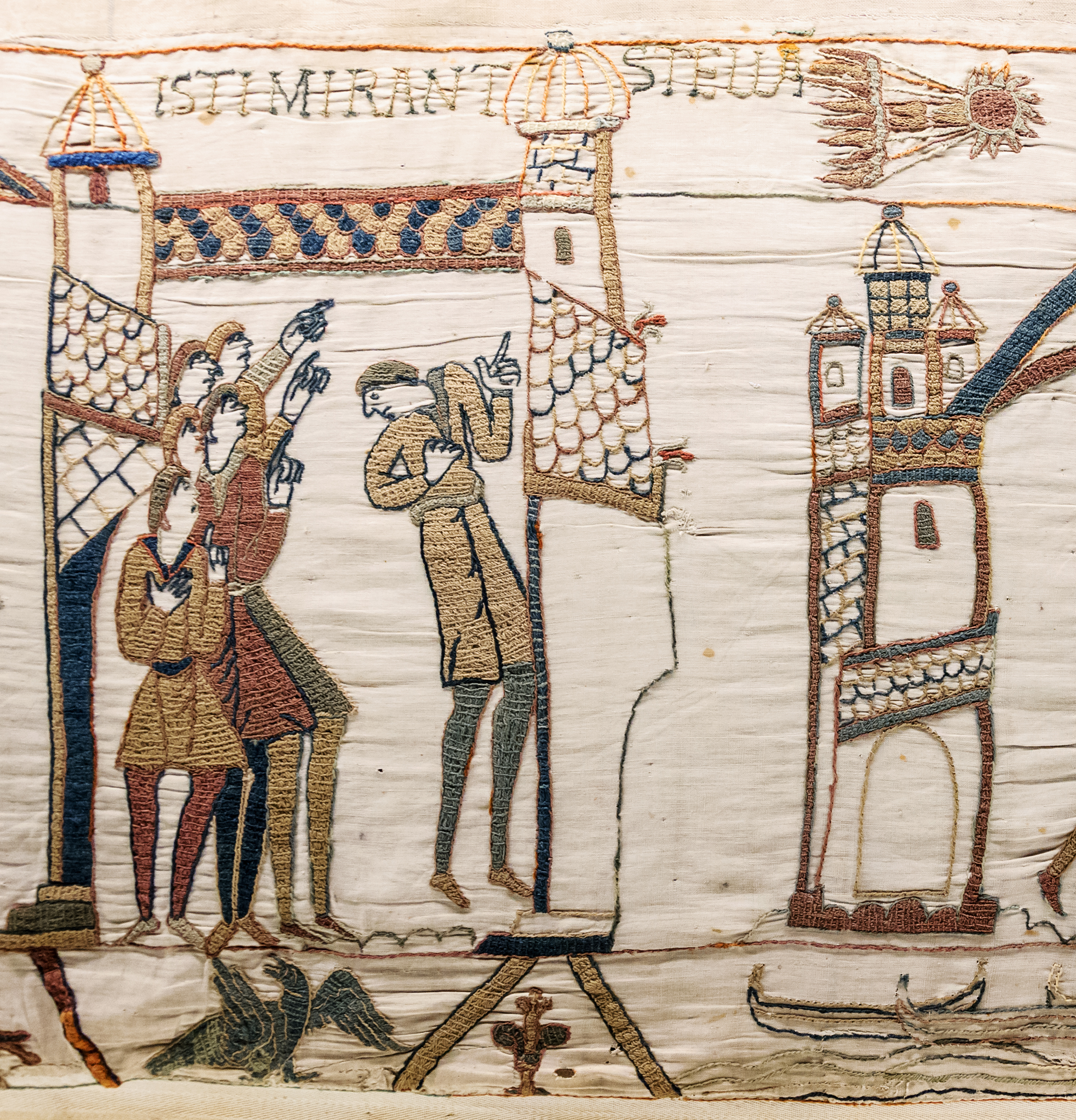
Halley's Comet appeared in 1066, prior to the Battle of Hastings, and is depicted in the Bayeux Tapestry.

There is a claim that an Arab scholar in 1258 noted several recurrent appearances of a comet (or a type of comet), and though it's not clear if he considered it to be a single periodic comet, it might have been a comet with a period of around 63 years.

In 1301, the Italian painter Giotto was the first person to accurately and anatomically portray a comet. In his work Adoration of the Magi, Giotto's depiction of Halley's Comet in the place of the Star of Bethlehem would go unmatched in accuracy until the 19th century and be bested only with the invention of photography.

Astrological interpretations of comets proceeded to take precedence clear into the 15th century, despite the presence of modern scientific astronomy beginning to take root. Comets continued to forewarn of disaster, as seen in the Luzerner Schilling chronicles and in the warnings of Pope Callixtus III. In 1578, German Lutheran bishop Andreas Celichius defined comets as "the thick smoke of human sins ... kindled by the hot and fiery anger of the Supreme Heavenly Judge". The next year, Andreas Dudith stated that "If comets were caused by the sins of mortals, they would never be absent from the sky."

=== Modern astronomy ===
Crude attempts at a parallax measurement of Halley's Comet were made in 1456, but were erroneous. Regiomontanus was the first to attempt to calculate diurnal parallax by observing the Great Comet of 1472. His predictions were not very accurate, but they were conducted in the hopes of estimating the distance of a comet from Earth.

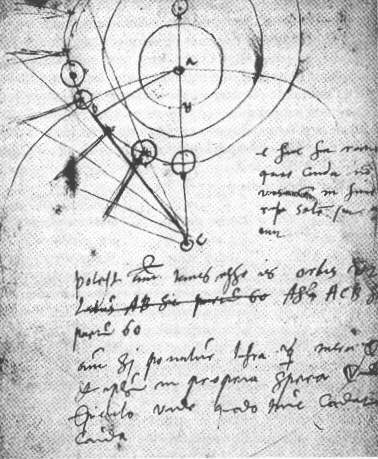
Tycho Brahe's sketching of his observations of the Great Comet of 1577 in his notebook

In the 16th century, Tycho Brahe and Michael Maestlin demonstrated that comets must exist outside of Earth's atmosphere by measuring the parallax of the Great Comet of 1577. Within the precision of the measurements, this implied the comet must be at least four times more distant than from Earth to the Moon. Based on observations in 1664, Giovanni Borelli recorded the longitudes and latitudes of comets that he observed, and suggested that cometary orbits may be parabolic. Despite being a skilled astronomer, in his 1623 book The Assayer, Galileo Galilei rejected Brahe's theories on the parallax of comets and claimed that they may be a mere optical illusion, despite little personal observation. In 1625, Maestlin's student Johannes Kepler upheld that Brahe's view of cometary parallax was correct. Mathematician Jacob Bernoulli published a treatise on comets in 1682, suggesting comets orbited a point outside the orbit of Saturn, in the manner of epicyles.

During the early modern period comets were studied for their astrological significance in medical disciplines. Many healers of this time considered medicine and astronomy to be inter-disciplinary and employed their knowledge of comets and other astrological signs for diagnosing and treating patients.

Isaac Newton, in his Principia Mathematica of 1687, proved that an object moving under the influence of gravity by an inverse square law must trace out an orbit shaped like one of the conic sections, and he demonstrated how to fit a comet's path through the sky to a parabolic orbit, using the comet of 1680 as an example. He describes comets as compact and durable solid bodies moving in oblique orbit and their tails as thin streams of vapor emitted by their nuclei, ignited or heated by the Sun. He suspected that comets were the origin of the life-supporting component of air. He pointed out that comets usually appear near the Sun, and therefore most likely orbit it. On their luminosity, he stated, "The comets shine by the Sun's light, which they reflect," with their tails illuminated by "the Sun's light reflected by a smoke arising from [the coma]".

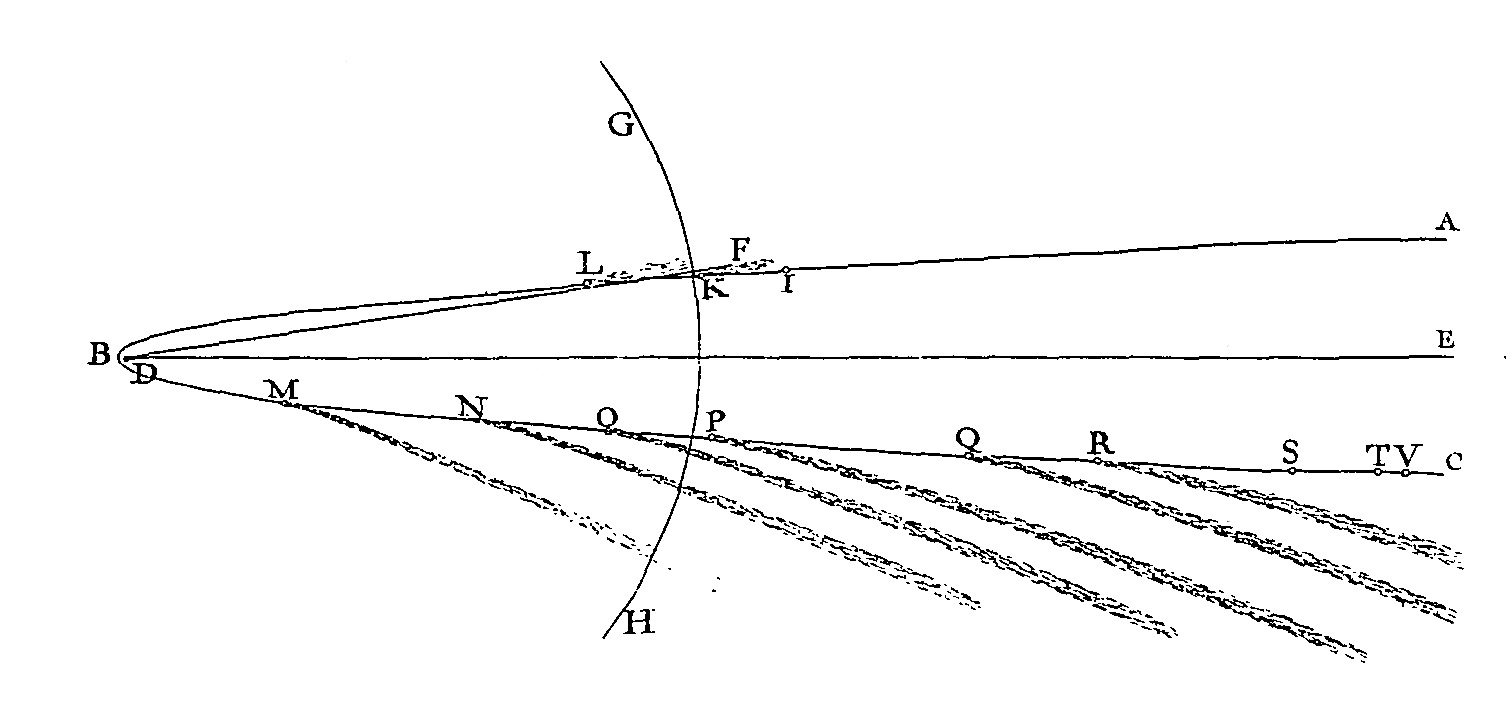
The orbit of the comet of 1680, fitted to a parabola, as shown in Newton's Principia

In 1705, Edmond Halley (1656–1742) applied Newton's method to 23 cometary apparitions that had occurred between 1337 and 1698. He noted that three of these, the comets of 1531, 1607, and 1682, had very similar orbital elements, and he was further able to account for the slight differences in their orbits in terms of gravitational perturbation caused by Jupiter and Saturn. Confident that these three apparitions had been three appearances of the same comet, he predicted that it would appear again in 1758–59. Halley's predicted return date was later refined by a team of three French mathematicians: Alexis Clairaut, Joseph Lalande, and Nicole-Reine Lepaute, who predicted the date of the comet's 1759 perihelion to within one month's accuracy. When the comet returned as predicted, it became known as Halley's Comet.

From his huge vapouring train perhaps to shake
Reviving moisture on the numerous orbs,
Thro' which his long ellipsis winds; perhaps
To lend new fuel to declining suns,
To light up worlds, and feed th' ethereal fire.

— James Thomson The Seasons (1730; 1748)

As early as the 18th century, some scientists had made correct hypotheses as to comets' physical composition. In 1755, Immanuel Kant hypothesized in his Universal Natural History that comets were condensed from "primitive matter" beyond the known planets, which is "feebly moved" by gravity, then orbit at arbitrary inclinations, and are partially vaporized by the Sun's heat as they near perihelion. In 1836, the German mathematician Friedrich Wilhelm Bessel, after observing streams of vapor during the appearance of Halley's Comet in 1835, proposed that the jet forces of evaporating material could be great enough to significantly alter a comet's orbit, and he argued that the non-gravitational movements of Encke's Comet resulted from this phenomenon.

In the 19th century, the Astronomical Observatory of Padova was an epicenter in the observational study of comets. Led by Giovanni Santini (1787–1877) and followed by Giuseppe Lorenzoni (1843–1914), this observatory was devoted to classical astronomy, mainly to the new comets and planets orbit calculation, with the goal of compiling a catalog of almost ten thousand stars. Situated in the Northern portion of Italy, observations from this observatory were key in establishing important geodetic, geographic, and astronomical calculations, such as the difference of longitude between Milan and Padua as well as Padua to Fiume. Correspondence within the observatory, particularly between Santini and another astronomer Giuseppe Toaldo, mentioned the importance of comet and planetary orbital observations.

In 1950, Fred Lawrence Whipple proposed that rather than being rocky objects containing some ice, comets were icy objects containing some dust and rock. This "dirty snowball" model soon became accepted and appeared to be supported by the observations of an armada of spacecraft (including the European Space Agency's Giotto probe and the Soviet Union's Vega 1 and Vega 2) that flew through the coma of Halley's Comet in 1986, photographed the nucleus, and observed jets of evaporating material.

On 22 January 2014, ESA scientists reported the detection, for the first definitive time, of water vapor on the dwarf planet Ceres, the largest object in the asteroid belt. The detection was made by using the far-infrared abilities of the Herschel Space Observatory. The finding is unexpected because comets, not asteroids, are typically considered to "sprout jets and plumes". According to one of the scientists, "The lines are becoming more and more blurred between comets and asteroids." On 11 August 2014, astronomers released studies, using the Atacama Large Millimeter/Submillimeter Array (ALMA) for the first time, that detailed the distribution of HCN, HNC, H_{2}CO, and dust inside the comae of comets C/2012 F6 (Lemmon) and C/2012 S1 (ISON).

=== Spacecraft missions ===
- The Halley Armada describes the collection of spacecraft missions that visited and/or made observations of Halley's Comet 1980s perihelion.
- Deep Impact. Debate continues about how much ice is in a comet. In 2001, the Deep Space 1 spacecraft obtained high-resolution images of the surface of Comet Borrelly. It was found that the surface of comet Borrelly is hot and dry, with a temperature of between 26 and 71 °C (79 and 160 °F), and extremely dark, suggesting that the ice has been removed by solar heating and maturation, or is hidden by the soot-like material that covers Borrelly. In July 2005, the Deep Impact probe blasted a crater on Comet Tempel 1 to study its interior. The mission yielded results suggesting that the majority of a comet's water ice is below the surface and that these reservoirs feed the jets of vaporized water that form the coma of Tempel 1. Renamed EPOXI, it made a flyby of Comet Hartley 2 on 4 November 2010.
- Ulysses. In 2007, the Ulysses probe passed through the tail of the comet C/2006 P1 (McNaught) and recorded data on the interaction of the tail and solar winds over a period of five days.
- Stardust. Data from the Stardust mission show that materials retrieved from the tail of Wild 2 were crystalline and could only have been "born in fire", at extremely high temperatures of over 1,000 °C (1,830 °F). Although comets formed in the outer Solar System, radial mixing of material during the early formation of the Solar System is thought to have redistributed material throughout the proto-planetary disk. As a result, comets contain crystalline grains that formed in the early, hot inner Solar System. This is seen in comet spectra as well as in sample return missions. More recent still, the materials retrieved demonstrate that the "comet dust resembles asteroid materials". These new results have forced scientists to rethink the nature of comets and their distinction from asteroids.
- Rosetta. The Rosetta probe orbited Comet Churyumov–Gerasimenko. On 12 November 2014, its lander Philae successfully landed on the comet's surface, the first time a spacecraft has ever landed on such an object in history.

== Classification ==
Comets can be classified by astronomers using the planets that control their perihelion and aphelion, Tisserand orbital parameters. Other more qualitative and casual classifications are also possible.

=== Great comets ===
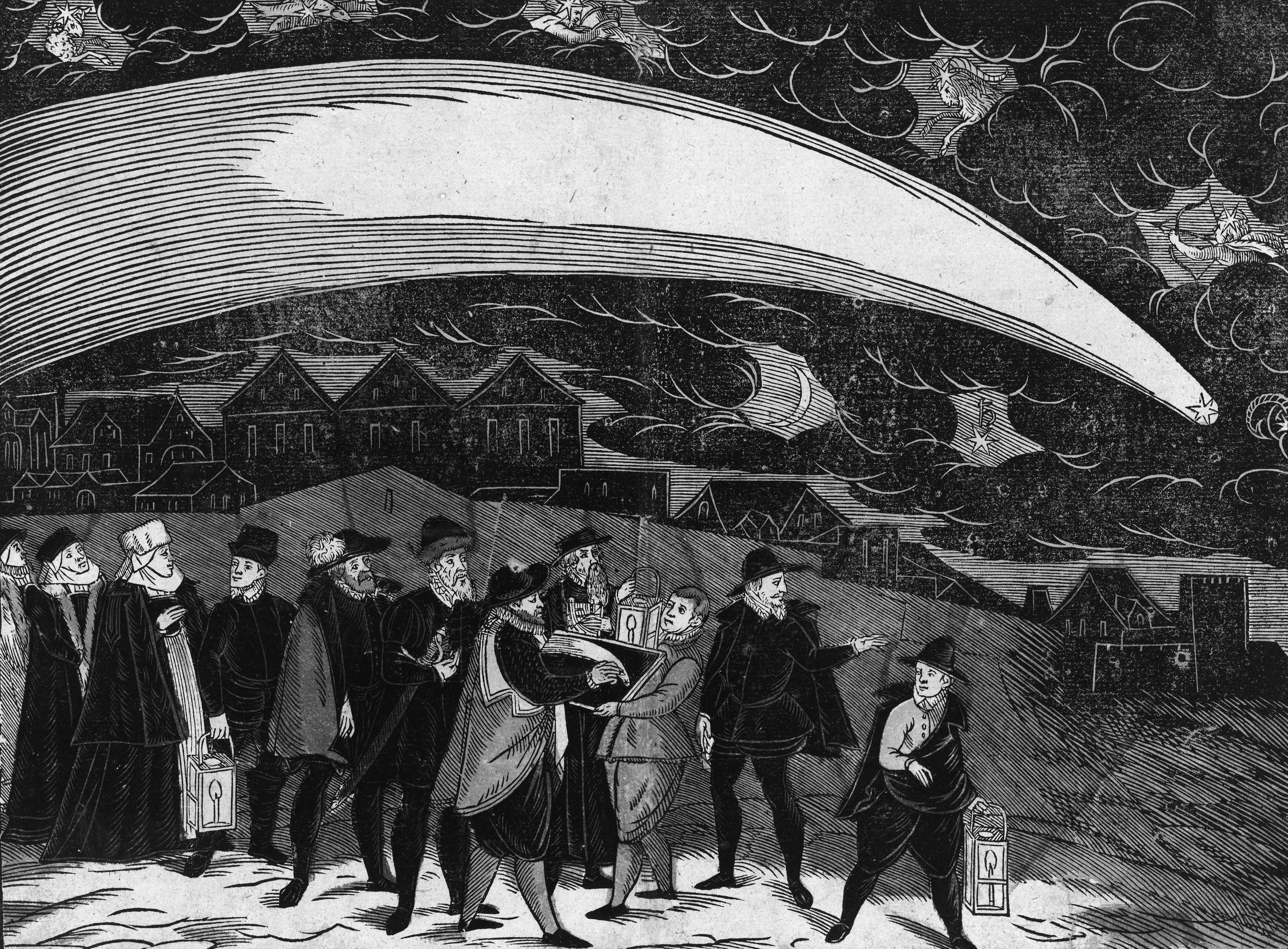
Woodcut of the Great Comet of 1577

Approximately once a decade, a comet becomes bright enough to be noticed by a casual observer, leading such comets to be designated as great comets. Predicting whether a comet will become a great comet is notoriously difficult, as many factors may cause a comet's brightness to depart drastically from predictions. Broadly speaking, if a comet has a large and active nucleus, will pass close to the Sun, and is not obscured by the Sun as seen from Earth when at its brightest, it has a chance of becoming a great comet. However, Comet Kohoutek in 1973 fulfilled all the criteria and was expected to become spectacular but failed to do so. Comet West, which appeared three years later, had much lower expectations but became an extremely impressive comet.

The Great Comet of 1577 is a well-known example of a great comet. It passed near Earth as a non-periodic comet and was seen by many, including well-known astronomers Tycho Brahe and Taqi ad-Din. Observations of this comet, together with the nova of 1572, cast doubt on the Aristotelian view of a constant universe.

The late 20th century saw a lengthy gap without the appearance of any great comets, followed by the arrival of two in quick succession—Comet Hyakutake in 1996, followed by Hale–Bopp, which reached maximum brightness in 1997 having been discovered two years earlier. The first great comet of the 21st century was C/2006 P1 (McNaught), which became visible to naked eye observers in January 2007. It was the brightest in over 40 years.

=== Sungrazing comets ===
A sungrazing comet is a comet that passes extremely close to the Sun at perihelion, generally within a few million kilometers. Although small sungrazers can be completely evaporated during such a close approach to the Sun, larger sungrazers can survive many perihelion passages. However, the strong tidal forces they experience often lead to their fragmentation.

About 90% of the sungrazers observed with SOHO are members of the Kreutz group, which all originate from one giant comet that broke up into many smaller comets during its first passage through the inner Solar System. The remainder contains some sporadic sungrazers, but four other related groups of comets have been identified among them: the Kracht, Kracht 2a, Marsden, and Meyer groups. The Marsden and Kracht groups both appear to be related to Comet 96P/Machholz, which is the parent of two meteor streams, the Quadrantids and the Arietids.

=== Unusual comets ===
Euler diagram showing the types of bodies in the Solar System

Of the thousands of known comets, some exhibit unusual properties. Comet Encke (2P/Encke) orbits from outside the asteroid belt to just inside the orbit of the planet Mercury whereas the Comet 29P/Schwassmann–Wachmann currently travels in a nearly circular orbit entirely between the orbits of Jupiter and Saturn. 2060 Chiron, whose unstable orbit is between Saturn and Uranus, was originally classified as an asteroid until a faint coma was noticed. Similarly, Comet Shoemaker–Levy 2 was originally designated asteroid 1990 UL_{3}.

=== Centaurs ===
Centaurs typically behave with characteristics of both asteroids and comets. Centaurs can be classified as comets such as 60558 Echeclus, and 166P/NEAT. 166P/NEAT was discovered while it exhibited a coma, and so is classified as a comet despite its orbit, and 60558 Echeclus was discovered without a coma but later became active, and was then classified as both a comet and an asteroid (174P/Echeclus). One plan for Cassini involved sending it to a centaur, but NASA decided to destroy it instead.

== Observation ==
In the outer Solar System, comets remain frozen and inactive and are extremely difficult or impossible to detect from Earth due to their small size. Statistical detections of inactive comet nuclei in the Kuiper belt have been reported from observations by the Hubble Space Telescope but these detections have been questioned.

Most comets are too faint to be visible without the aid of a telescope, but a few each decade become bright enough to be visible to the naked eye. A comet may be discovered photographically using a wide-field telescope or visually with binoculars. However, even without access to optical equipment, it is still possible for the amateur astronomer to discover a sungrazing comet online by downloading images accumulated by some satellite observatories such as SOHO. SOHO's 2000th comet was discovered by Polish amateur astronomer Michał Kusiak on 26 December 2010 and both discoverers of Hale–Bopp used amateur equipment (although Hale was not an amateur).

=== Naming convention ===
Comets are named by the Minor Planet Center of the International Astronomical Union. The names start with a prefix related to the object's orbit: P/ for a period of 200 years or less, C/ otherwise, with X/ for unknown and D/ for a periodic comet that has disappeared. Following the prefix is the date of discovery as a numerical year, uppercase letter for the half-month. Additional information encoded in the name includes observation of returns. The system began in 1995.

== In popular culture ==
The depiction of comets in popular culture is firmly rooted in the long Western tradition of seeing comets as harbingers of doom and as omens of world-altering change. Halley's Comet alone has caused a slew of sensationalist publications of all sorts at each of its reappearances. It was especially noted that the birth and death of some notable persons coincided with separate appearances of the comet, such as with writers Mark Twain (who correctly speculated that he'd "go out with the comet" in 1910) and Eudora Welty, to whose life Mary Chapin Carpenter dedicated the song "Halley Came to Jackson".

In times past, bright comets often inspired panic and hysteria in the general population, being thought of as bad omens. More recently, during the passage of Halley's Comet in 1910, Earth passed through the comet's tail, and erroneous newspaper reports inspired a fear that cyanogen in the tail might poison millions, whereas the appearance of Comet Hale–Bopp in 1997 triggered the mass suicide of the Heaven's Gate cult.

In science fiction, the impact of comets has been depicted as a threat overcome by technology and heroism (as in the 1998 films Deep Impact and Armageddon), or as a trigger of global apocalypse (Lucifer's Hammer, 1979) or zombies (Night of the Comet, 1984). In Jules Verne's Off on a Comet a group of people are stranded on a comet orbiting the Sun, while a large crewed space expedition visits Halley's Comet in Sir Arthur C. Clarke's novel 2061: Odyssey Three.

== Gallery ==
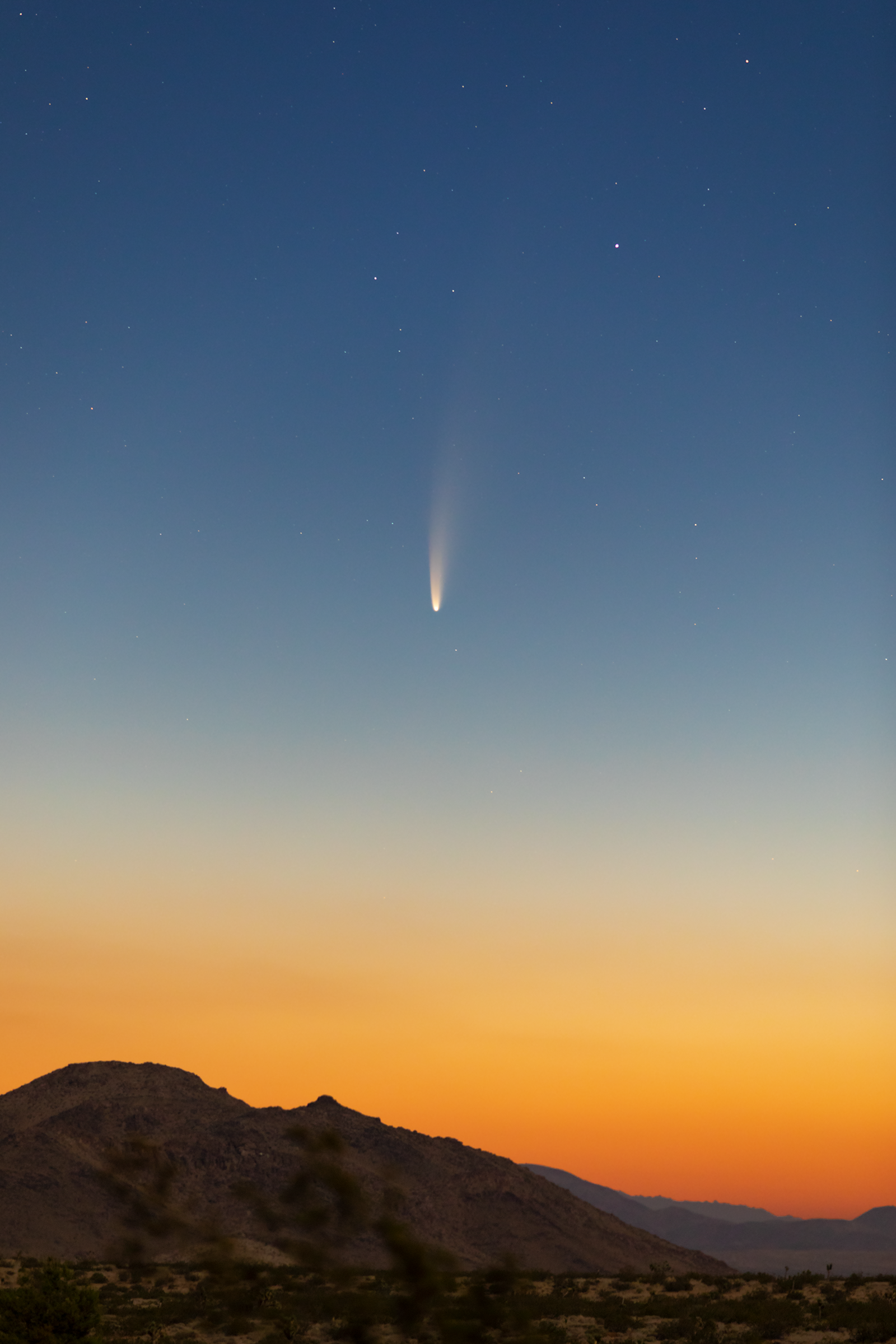
Comet C/2020 F3 NEOWISE, July 2020

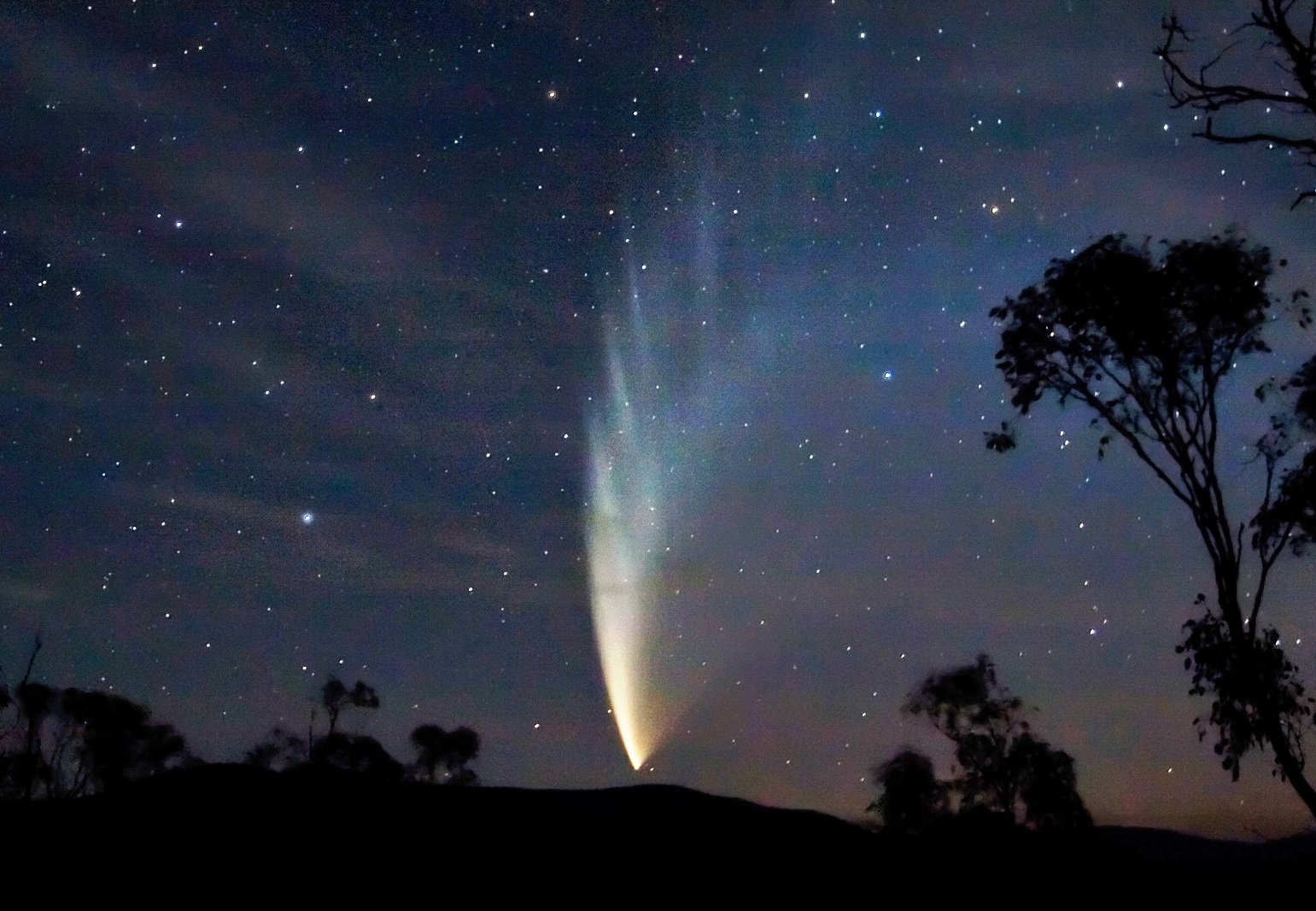
Comet C/2006 P1 (McNaught) taken from Victoria, Australia 2007

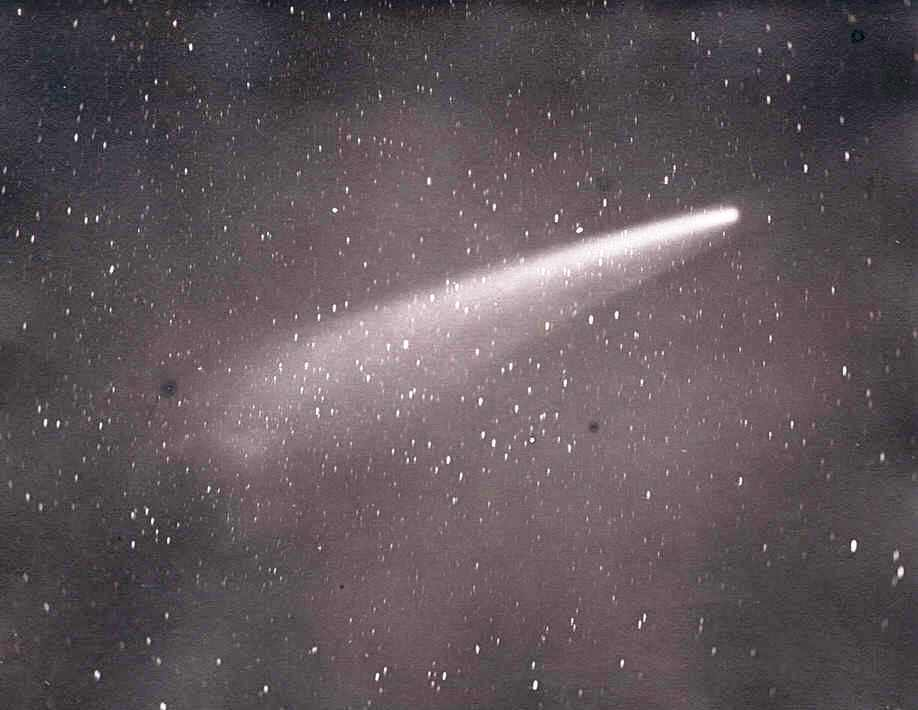
The Great Comet of 1882 is a member of the Kreutz group

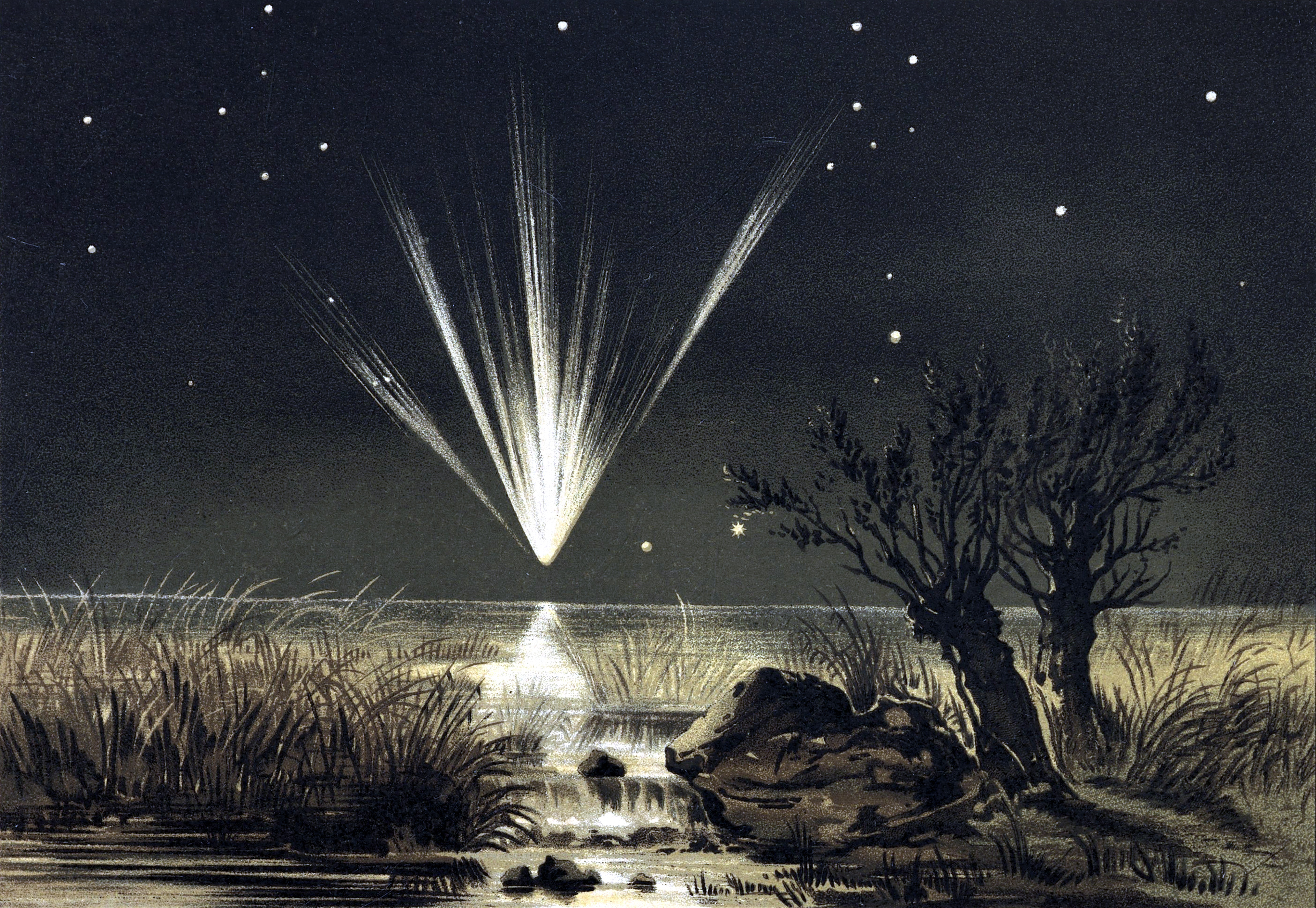
Austrian astronomer Edmund Weiss sketched the Great Comet of 1861

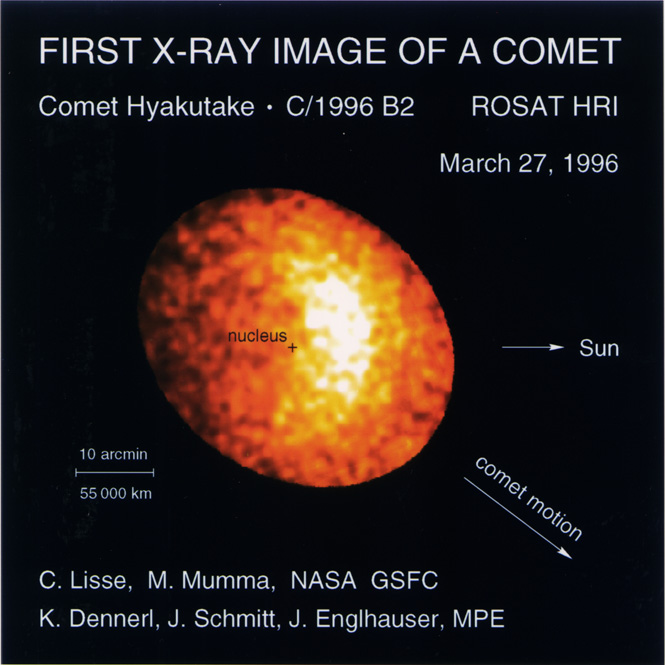
Comet Hyakutake (X-ray, ROSAT satellite)

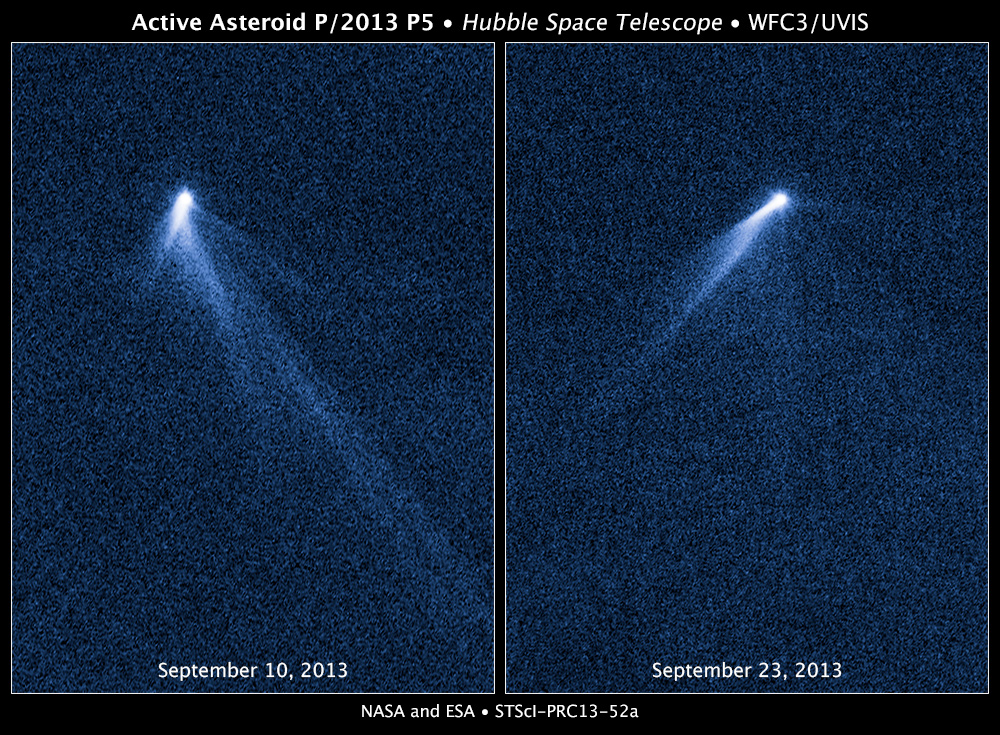
"Active asteroid" 311P/PANSTARRS with several tails

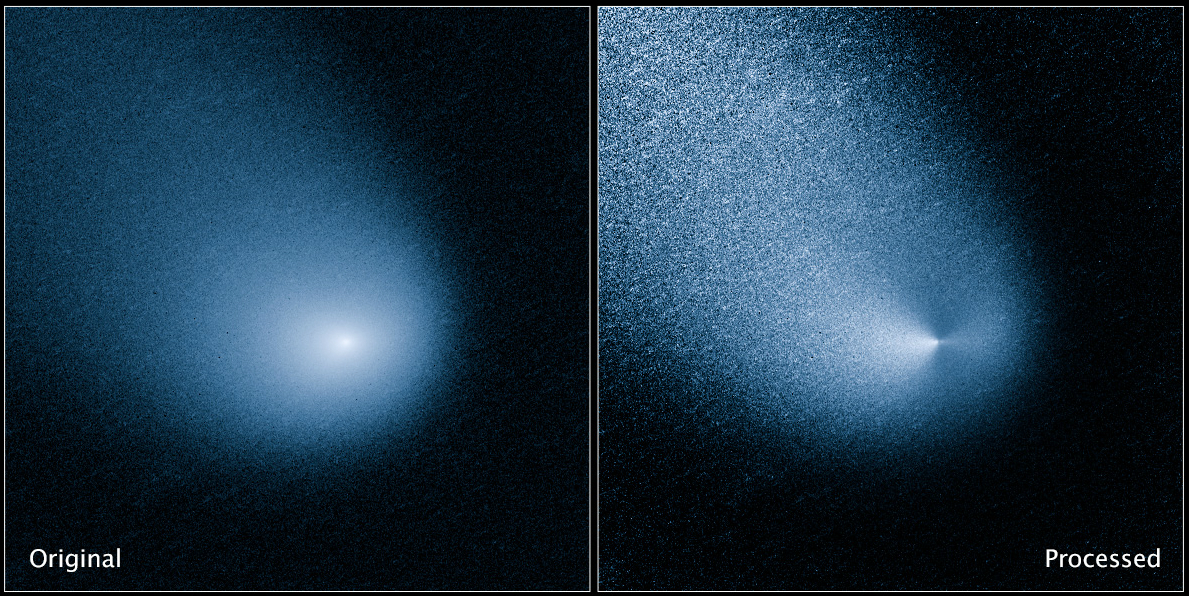
Comet Siding Spring (Hubble; 11 March 2014)

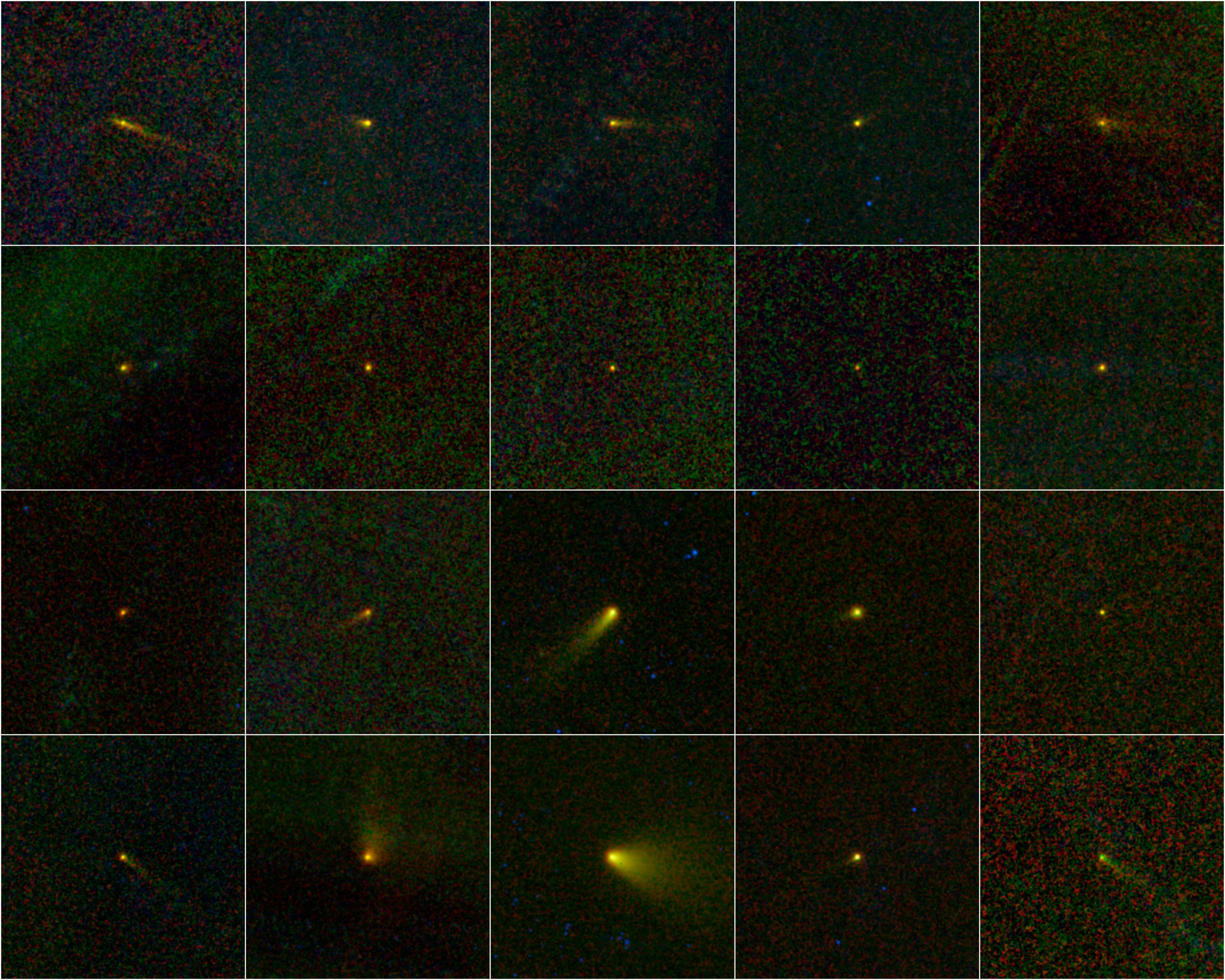
Mosaic of 20 comets discovered by the WISE space telescope

NEOWISE – Comets appear in yellow in Neowise's first four years of collecting data (December 2013 to December 2017)

The STEREO solar observatory filmed Comet Lovejoy moving against the solar wind as it approached the Sun in December 2011

View from Deep Impact's impactor in its last moments before hitting Comet Tempel 1, 4 July 2005

Videos

NASA is developing a comet harpoon for returning samples to Earth.

The STEREO solar observatory filmed Comet Encke temporarily losing its tail, 20 April 2007.

== See also ==
- The Big Splash
- Comet vintages
- List of impact structures on Earth
- List of possible impact structures on Earth
- Lists of comets
