= Big Splash =

Big Splash or Big splash may refer to:

- The Big Splash (book), (1990) by Louis A. Frank and Patrick Huyghe
- The Big Splash (film), a 1935 British comedy film
- Jo Brand's Big Splash, a British television programme
- Professional wrestling attacks § Big splash a professional wrestling attack
- A Big Splash, an episode of Ninjago

== Places ==
- Big Splash Waterpark Canberra
- Big Splash, Singapore, a former waterpark, turned into a dining and recreation complex, demolished in 2017

== See also ==
- A Bigger Splash (disambiguation)
- Splash (fluid mechanics)
