= A Bigger Splash (disambiguation) =

A Bigger Splash is a large pop art painting by British artist David Hockney. It may also refer to:

- A Bigger Splash (1973 film)
- A Bigger Splash (2015 film)

== See also ==
- Big Splash (disambiguation)
