= Mercurius Gallobelgicus =

Early printed periodical in Latin

The Mercurius Gallobelgicus was an early printed periodical, published semi-annually, and written in Latin. It first appeared in 1592 in Cologne, Germany, compiled by the Dutch Catholic refugee Michael ab Isselt, under the pseudonym "D. M. Jansonius". It was distributed widely, even finding its way to readers in England.

After Isselt's death, rival continuations were printed in Cologne and Frankfurt. The Frankfurt Mercurii Gallobelgici succenturiati was compiled by Gotthard Arthusius from 1603 to 1626, then briefly by Georg Beatus, and from 1628 by Johann Philipp Abelin. The Cologne continuation, under the title Annalium Mercurio Gallobelgico succenturiatorum, was the work of Gaspar Ens. It was last published in 1635.
