= Gotthard Arthusius =

Schoolmaster, historian and translator (1568–1628)

Gotthard Arthus or Gotardus Artusius Dantiscanus (1568–1628) was a schoolmaster, historian and translator in early seventeenth-century Frankfurt.

== Life ==
Gotthard Arthus was born in Danzig on 11 January 1568. In 1589 he matriculated at the University of Jena, graduating Master of Arts in 1592. Four years later a Johann Arthus matriculated who may have been a relation. In 1595 he was appointed to the city school in Frankfurt on Main, becoming deputy head in 1618.

He died in Frankfurt on 15 February 1628.

Among his publications is a continuation of Michael ab Isselt's Mercurius Gallobelgicus, for the years 1603–1626, printed in Frankfurt and distinct from the Cologne continuation. He was also a translator from Dutch.

== Works ==
- Historia Indiae orientalis (Frankfurt, 1600)
- Historia chronologica Pannoniae (Frankfurt, 1608)
- Cometa orientalis: kurtze Beschreibung desz newen Cometen (Frankfurt, 1619; available on Gallica.fr) – a discussion of the Great Comet of 1618.
- Commentariorum de rebus in Regno Antichristi memorabilibus (3 vols., Frankfurt, 1620)
- Sleidanus redivivus (Frankfurt, 1618) – a continuation of Johannes Sleidanus, Commentariorum de statu religionis et reipublicae
- Mercurius Gallobelgicus succenturiati (Frankfurt, 1603–1626)
