= Shock synthesis =

Shock synthesis is the process of complex organic chemical creation through high velocity impact on simple amino acids, theorized to take place when a comet strikes a planetary body, or through the shock-wave created by a thunder clap. Hyper-velocity impact shock of a typical comet ice mixture produced several amino acids after hydrolysis. These include equal amounts of D- and L-alanine, and the non-protein amino acids α-aminoisobutyric acid and isovaline as well as their precursors.
