= Michael ab Isselt =

Dutch Catholic exile in Cologne and chronicler

- Born: between 1530 and 1540; Amersfoort, Lordship of Utrecht
- Died: 17 October 1597; Hamburg
- Education: Leuven University
- Occupation: clergyman
- Writing career
- Pen name: D. M. Jansonio Doccomensi
- Language: Latin
- Genres: history, spirituality
- Subjects: contemporary history
- Notable work: Mercurius Gallobelgicus (1592–1597)

Michael ab Isselt (1530/40–1597), sometimes cited in the German form von Isselt, was a Dutch Catholic exile in Cologne and a chronicler of the late 16th century. He is best known as the compiler (under the pseudonym "D. M. Jansonio") of the first Mercurius Gallobelgicus, a semi-annual overview of important current events.

== Life ==
Isselt was born between 1530 and 1540 in Amersfoort in the Lordship of Utrecht. He studied at the University of Leuven and became a priest. During the Dutch Revolt he went into exile in Cologne, where he became an active writer, recording contemporary events from a Catholic perspective. He died in Hamburg on 17 October 1597. He also edited the works of Louis of Granada for publication in Cologne, translating some from Spanish or Italian into Latin.

== Works ==
- Belli Coloniensis libri quinque (Cologne, Gottfried von Kempen, 1586)
  - Histoire de la guerre de Cologne, French translation by Joseph de Cantarel (Paris, Raulin Thierry, 1589)
- Commentarius brevis rerum in orbe gestarum, a capta antwerpia, hoc est, ab augusto mense anni 1585. usque ad septembrim anni 1586 (Cologne, Gottfried von Kempen, 1586)
  - Kurtze chronick oder historische beschreybung der furnembsten hendel so sich beyde in religions und weltlichen sachen fast durch die gantze welt zugetragen haben im jar 1585. Vom Augstmonat an biß auff den September anno 1586 (Cologne, Heinrich Nettesheim, 1587)
- Mercurius Gallobelgicus (Cologne, Gottfried von Kempen, 1592–1597). September 1592 edition on Google Books.
