= Jet force =

Jet force is the exhaust from some machine, especially aircraft, propelling the object itself in the opposite direction as per Newton's third law. An understanding of jet force is intrinsic to the launching of drones, satellites, rockets, airplanes and other airborne machines.

Jet force begins with some propulsion system; in the case of a rocket, this is usually some system that kicks out combustible gases from the bottom. This repulsion system pushes out these gas molecules in the direction opposite the intended motion so rapidly that the opposite force, acting 180° away from the direction the gas molecules are moving, (as such, in the intended direction of movement) pushes the rocket up. A common wrong assumption is that the rocket elevates by pushing off the ground. If this were the case, the rocket would be unable to continue moving upwards after the aircraft is no longer close to the ground. Rather, the opposite force by the expelled gases is the reason for movement.

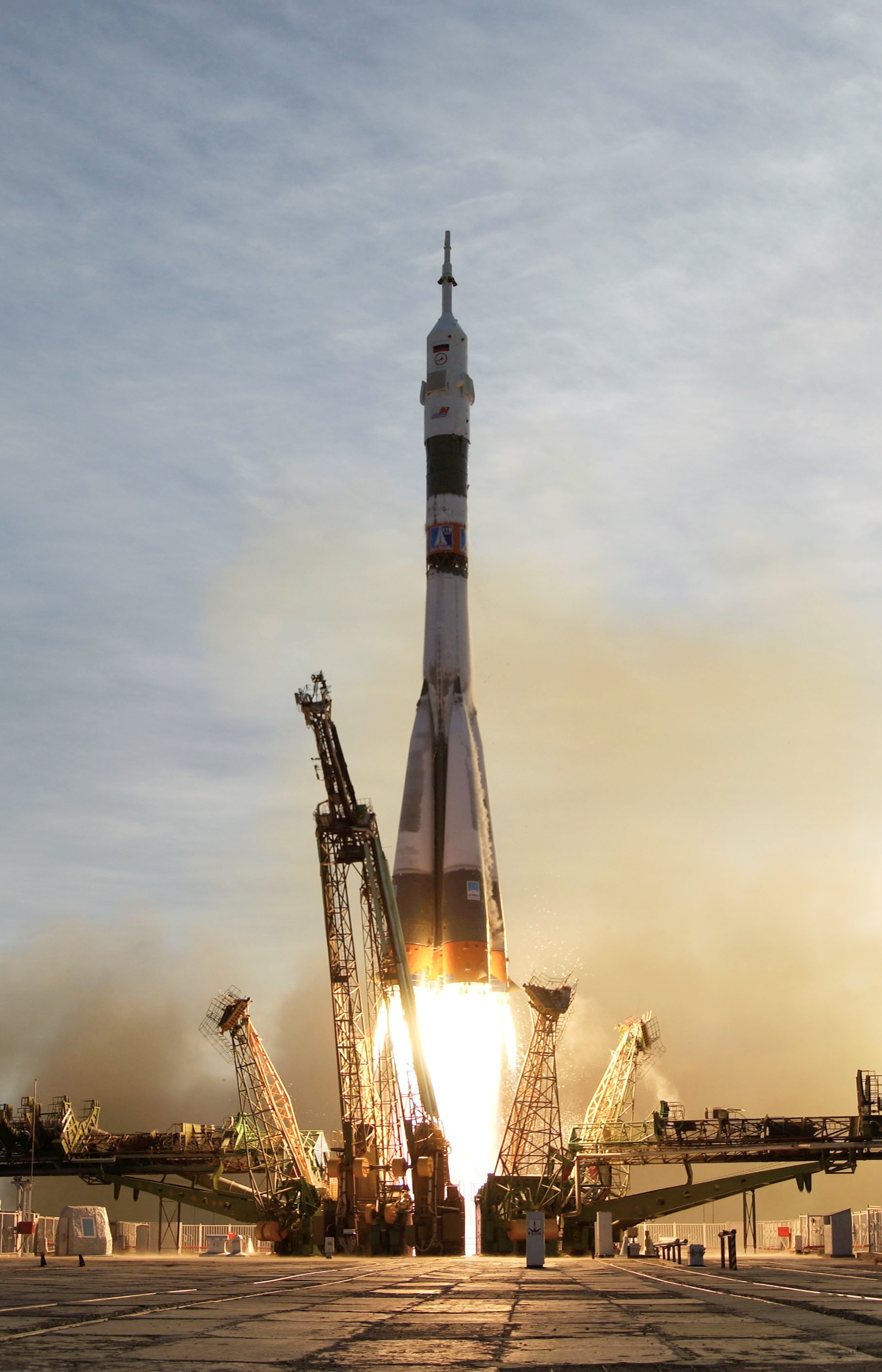
Jet force in action, the force that propels this rocket into take off

== Thrust, lift, weight and drag ==
The jet force can be divided into components. The "forward" component of this force is generally referred to as thrust. The upward component of jet force is referred to as lift. There are also two other forces that impact motion of aircraft. Drag, which is also referred to as air resistance, is the force that opposes motion. As such, it acts against both components of the jet force (both the thrust and the lift). The fourth and final force is the weight itself, which acts directly downward.

=== Thrust ===
To analyze thrust, we take a mathematical perspective.

1. First, an aircraft takes off at some angle with respect to the ground. For a rocket traveling straight "up", this angle would be 90°, or at least close to 90°. For airplanes and most other aircraft, this angle will be much less, generally ranging from 0° to 60°. We shall define this angle as θ.
2. θ is constantly changing as the aircraft moves around. At any given moment, however, the cosine of this angle θ will give us the component of the force that is acting in the forward direction. Multiplying the total force by this cosine of θ would yield the thrust: $\text{Thrust} = \text{Jet Force} \times \cos\theta$

Because θ ranges from 0° to 90° and the cosine of any angle in this range is 0 ≤ cos θ≤ 1, the thrust will always be either less than or equal to the jet force- as expected, as the thrust is a component of the jet force.

=== Lift ===
Similar to our analysis of thrust, we begin with a mathematical look:

1. We define angle θ the same way we did in step 1 for thrust. Again, this angle θ is different at any given time.
2. For lift, however, we are looking for the vertical component, rather than the forward component. The sine of angle θ will give us the component of the force acting in vertical component. Multiplying the jet force by the sine of θ will yield the lift: $\text{Lift} = \text{Jet Force} \times \sin\theta$

Similar to cosine, the sine of an angle ranging from 0° to 90° will always between at least zero and at most one. As such, the lift will also be less than the jet force. Of jet force, lift and thrust, we can find any one of these if the other two are given using the distance formula. In this case, that would be: $\text{Jet Force} = \sqrt{\text{Thrust}^2 + \text{Lift}^2}$

As such, jet force, thrust and lift are inherently linked.

=== Drag ===
Drag, or air resistance, is a force that opposes motion. Since the thrust is a force that provides "forward motion" and, lift one that produces "upward motion", the drag opposes both of these forces. Air resistance is friction between the air itself and the moving object (in this case the aircraft). The calculation of air resistance is far more complicated than that of thrust and lift- it has to do with the material of the aircraft, the speed of the aircraft and other variable factors. However, rockets and airplanes are built with materials and in shapes that minimize drag force, maximizing the force that moves the aircraft upward/forward.

=== Weight ===
Weight is the downward force that the lift must overcome to produce upward movement. On earth, weight is fairly easy to calculate: $\text{Weight} = mg$

In this equation, m represents the mass of the object and g is the acceleration that is produced by gravity. On earth, this value is approximately 9.8 m/s squared. When the force for lift is greater than the force of weight, the aircraft accelerates upwards.

== Analysis with momentum ==
To calculate the speed of the vessel due to the jet force itself, analysis of momentum is necessary. Conservation of momentum states the following: $m_1 v_1 + m_2 v_2 = m_1 v_{1f} + m_2 v_{2f}$

In this situation, m_{1} represents the mass of the gas in the propulsion system, v_{1} represents the initial speed of this gas, m_{2} represents the mass of the rocket and v_{2} represents the initial velocity of the rocket. On the other end of the equation, v_{1f} represents the final velocity of the gas and v_{2f} represents the final velocity of the rocket. Initially, both the gas in the propulsion system and the rocket are stationary, leading to v_{1} and v_{2} equaling 0. As such, the equation can be simplified to the following: $0 = m_1 v_{1f} + m_2 v_{2f}$

After some more simple algebra, we can calculate that v_{2} (the velocity of the rocket) is the following: $v_{2f} = -\frac{m_1 v_1}{m_2}$

This gives us the velocity of the aircraft right after it takes off. Because we know all forces acting on it from this point on, we can calculate net acceleration using Newton's second law. Given the velocity that the aircraft takes off with and the acceleration at any point, the velocity can also be calculated at any given point.
