= The Big Splash (book) =

Book by Louis A. Frank

The Big Splash ...
- Hardcover edition
- Author: Louis A. Frank; Patrick Huyghe
- Language: English
- Subject: Astronomy
- Genre: Non-fiction
- Publisher: Birch Lane Press; Carol Publishing Group
- Publication date: October 1990
- Publication place: United States
- Media type: Print, e-book
- ISBN: 1-55972-033-6
- OCLC: 22109729
- Dewey Decimal: 550 20
- LC Class: QB631 .F68 1990

The Big Splash: A Scientific Discovery That Revolutionizes the Way We View the Origin of Life, the Water We Drink, the Death of the Dinosaurs, the Creation of the Oceans, the Nature of the Cosmos, and the Very Future of the Earth Itself is a 1990 book written by Louis A. Frank with Patrick Huyghe. In the book, Frank claims to have found scientific evidence that every year, millions of small comets (made of ice and water) strike the Earth's atmosphere, and that these comets created Earth's lakes, rivers and oceans.

While many scientists disputed Frank's hypothesis, he continued to argue that there are tests which can be performed which would either rule it out or confirm it.

== Authors ==
Louis A. Frank was a Carver/James A. Van Allen Professor of Physics at the University of Iowa, and principal investigator for the auroral imaging instruments for NASA's Dynamics Explorer mission.

Patrick Huyghe is a science writer.
