= ISEE =

The acronym ISEE can refer to:

- ISEE (company), Integration Software Electronics Engineering
- Independent School Entrance Examination
- International Sun/Earth Explorer, one of a series of spacecraft, ISEE-1, ISEE-2 and ISEE-3, the last later called the International Cometary Explorer
- International Society for Ecological Economics
- International Society for Environmental Epidemiology
- International Society for Environmental Ethics
- International Society for Explosive Engineers
- Institut national de la statistique et des études économiques, the national statistics bureau of France
- Institute of Statistics and Economic Studies, the statistics bureau of New Caledonia
