= NRAO 140 =

Quasar in the constellation Perseus

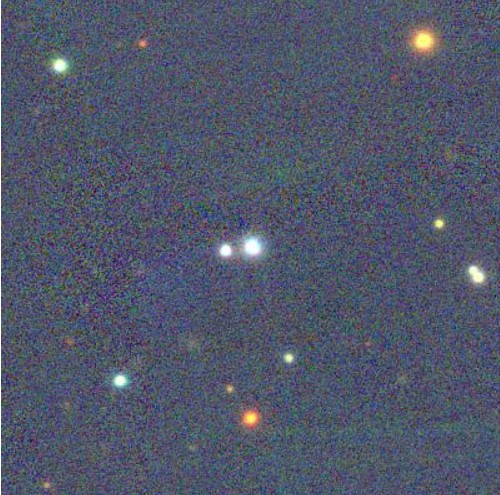
- The quasar NRAO 140.

Observation data (J2000.0 epoch)
- Constellation: Perseus
- Right ascension: 03^{h} 36^{m} 30.1076^{s}
- Declination: +32° 18′ 29.342″
- Redshift: 1.265200
- Heliocentric radial velocity: 379,297 km/s
- Distance: 8.432 Gly
- Apparent magnitude (V): 17.50

Characteristics
- Type: Opt. var, LPQ, RLQ

Other designations
- INTREF 154, LEDA 2820229, QSO J0336+3218, OHIO E 355, 2E 801, 1H 0332+317, 4C 32.14, DA 107, RX J0336.5+3218

NRAO 140 is a quasar located in the constellation of Perseus, noted for its low frequency variability. It has a redshift of (z) 1.258, first discovered in 1973 by Duncan Agnew and Halton Arp as an astronomical radio source, whom they catalogued it as 4C 32.14.

== Description ==
NRAO 140 is classified as a radio-selected blazar (RBL) based on European X-ray Observatory Satellite (EXOSAT) observations. However the object has no presence of either long-term or rapid fluxes. Its radio spectrum is flat, making it a flat-spectrum radio quasar, but also exhibiting radio and X-ray fluxes that lasted between 1979 and 1985. The brightness temperature of NRAO 140 is estimated to be between 5 × 10^{15} and 5 × 10^{14} Kelvin.

A low frequency outburst was detected in NRAO 140 by the Very Long Baseline Array (VLBI) observations, peaking in 1981 with the component undergoing a decrease in brightness levels as the outburst faded. Between August 7 and 9 in 1986, the object displayed rising levels in K flux from 1.25 ± 0.06 mJy to around 1.54 ± 0.05 mJy in a span of two days during the observation campaign.

Radio imaging made by Very Large Array (VLA) at both 21 and 6 centimeters (cm) shows the structure of NRAO 140 is made up of only a single secondary component with a position angle of 150°. Other radio images made by the Westerbork Synthesis Radio Telescope shows NRAO 140 has two components located on both sides of the radio core, consisting of a southwestern component at a position angle of 149° and a northeastern component at a position angle of -31° opposed to images made by VLA. VLBI observations also shows evidence of superluminal motion in several components separating at an angular rate of 0.10-0.14 milliarcseconds.

The jet in NRAO 140 is found to bend slightly towards the south direction from the radio core with detections of polarized flux in its jet components. In additional, the position angle of the jet is found nearly perpendicular towards the jet's axis, with the jet itself having a faraday rotation measure gradient extended by 8 milliarcseconds from the core. By constraining the upper limits of the jet's viewing angle, the jet is confirmed to have a linear extent greater than 350 parsecs.
