= ESRO 2B =

Research satellite

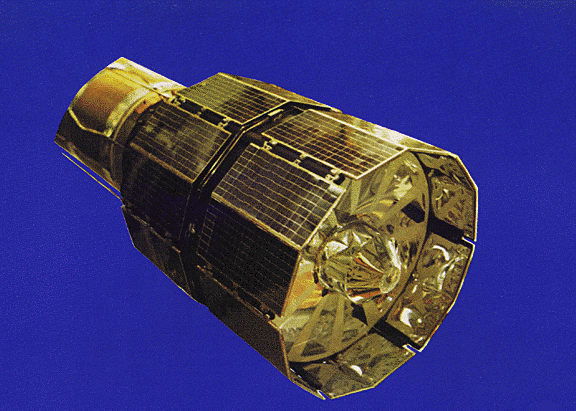
- Mission type: Astrophysics
- Operator: ESRO
- COSPAR ID: 1968-041A
- SATCAT no.: 03233

Spacecraft properties
- Launch mass: 89.8 kilograms (198 lb)

Start of mission
- Launch date: 17 May 1968, 02:06:00 UTC
- Rocket: Scout B
- Launch site: Vandenberg SLC-5

End of mission
- Decay date: 8 May 1971, shortly after 03:00 UT

Orbital parameters
- Reference system: Geocentric
- Regime: Low Earth
- Perigee altitude: 326 kilometres (203 mi)
- Apogee altitude: 1,086 kilometres (675 mi)
- Inclination: 97.2 degrees
- Period: 98.9 minutes
- Epoch: 16 May 1968, 22:09:00 UTC

ESRO-2B or Iris (International Radiation Investigation Satellite; sometimes Iris 2) or sometimes ESRO II (or ESRO 2), was a European astrophysical spin-stabilised research satellite which was launched in 1968. Operated by the European Space Research Organisation, ESRO 2B made astronomical surveys primarily in x-ray and solar particles detectors.

== Spacecraft ==
ESRO-2B was an 89 kg (196 lb) cylindrical spacecraft with a length of 85 cm and a diameter of 76 cm. On 10 December 1968 (approx 195 days since mission start) the on-board tape recorder suffered a mechanical failure. This effectively ended the two X-ray experiments as they did not provide any significant data return from then on. Other experiments could still be operated through ground radio links.

ESRO-2B was launched on a Scout B rocket into a highly elliptical near-polar orbit on 17 May 1968. Its predecessor satellite, ESRO-2A (sometimes Iris 1) failed to reach orbit on 29 May 1967, launching on a Scout B rocket from Vandenberg AFB SLC-5. The cause of failure was malfunction of the third stage of the rocket, preventing the satellite from reaching orbit. ESRO-2A was similar to ESRO-2B except it weighed a little less (74 kg).

Spin-stabilised, ESRO-2B had a spin rate of approximately 40 rpm and re-entered Earth's atmosphere on 8 May 1971 after completing 16,282 orbits.

=== Instruments ===
Seven instruments were carried aboard EROS 2B designed to detect high energy cosmic rays, determine the total flux of solar X-rays and to measure Van Allen belt protons and cosmic ray protons. While designed for solar observations ESRO-2B is credited with the detection of X-rays from non-solar sources. The instruments were:

- Monitor of Energetic Particle Flux
- Solar and Van Allen Belt Protons
- Solar and Galactic Alpha Particles and Protons
- Primary Cosmic Ray Electrons
- Hard Solar X-rays
- Soft Solar X-rays
- Flux and Energy Spectra of Solar and Galactic Cosmic Ray Particles
