= EXOSAT =

Space observatory

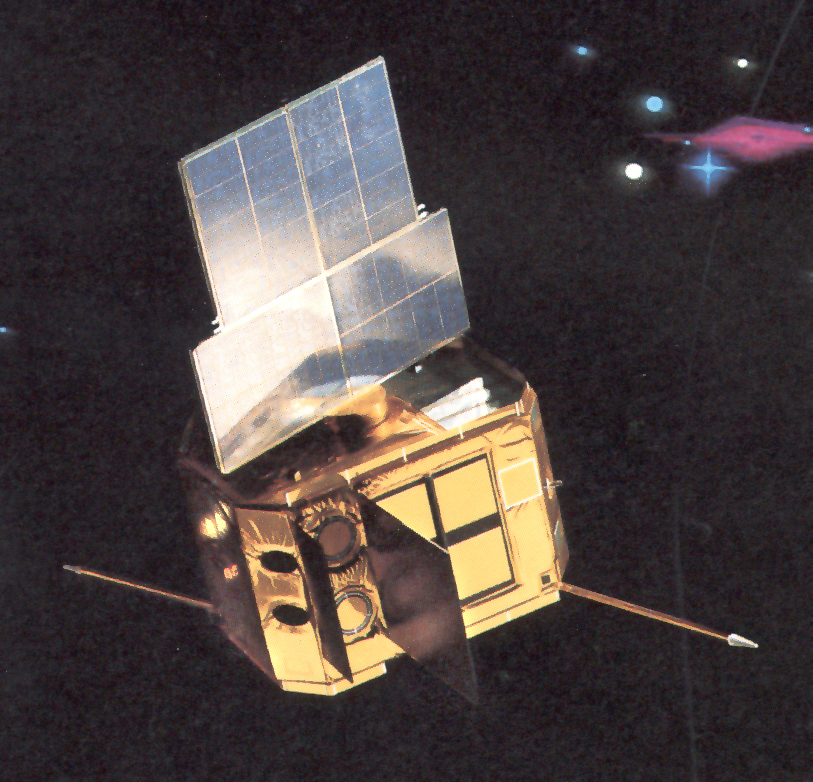
- EXOSAT
- Mission type: Astronomy
- Operator: ESA
- COSPAR ID: 1983-051A
- SATCAT no.: 14095
- Website: www.esa.int/export/esaSC/120394_index_0_m.html
- Mission duration: 3 years

Spacecraft properties
- Manufacturer: MBB
- Launch mass: 510.0 kg (1,124.4 lb)
- Power: 165.0 watts

Start of mission
- Launch date: 26 May 1983, 15:18:00 UTC
- Rocket: Delta 3914 D169
- Launch site: Vandenberg SLC-2W

End of mission
- Decay date: 5 May 1986

Orbital parameters
- Reference system: Geocentric
- Regime: Low Earth
- Eccentricity: 0.93428
- Perigee altitude: 347 km (216 mi)
- Apogee altitude: 191,709 km (119,122 mi)
- Inclination: 72.5 degrees
- Period: 5,435.4 minutes
- Epoch: 26 May 1983, 11:18:00 UTC
- Legacy ESA insignia (2020s)

The European X-ray Observatory Satellite (EXOSAT), originally named HELOS, was an X-ray telescope operational from May 1983 until April 1986 and in that time made 1780 observations in the X-ray band of most classes of astronomical object including active galactic nuclei, stellar coronae, cataclysmic variables, white dwarfs, X-ray binaries, clusters of galaxies, and supernova remnants.

This European Space Agency (ESA) satellite for direct-pointing and lunar-occultation observation of X-ray sources beyond the Solar System was launched into a highly eccentric orbit (apogee 200,000 km, perigee 500 km) almost perpendicular to that of the Moon on 26 May 1983. The instrumentation includes two low-energy imaging telescopes (LEIT) with Wolter I X-ray optics (for the 0.04–2 keV energy range), a medium-energy experiment using Ar/CO_{2} and Xe/CO_{2} detectors (for 1.5–50 keV), a Xe/He gas scintillation spectrometer (GSPC) (covering 2–80 keV), and a reprogrammable onboard data-processing computer. Exosat was capable of observing an object (in the direct-pointing mode) for up to 80 hours and of locating sources to within at least 10 arcsec with the LEIT and about 2 arcsec with GSPC.

== History of Exosat ==
During the period from 1967 to 1969, the European Space Research Organisation (ESRO) studied two separate missions: a European X-ray observatory satellite, as a combined X- and gamma-ray observatory (Cos-A), and a gamma-ray observatory (Cos-B). Cos-A was dropped after the initial study, and Cos-B was proceeded with.

Later in 1969 a separate satellite (the Highly Eccentric Lunar Occultation Satellite - Helos) was proposed. The Helos mission was to determine accurately the location of bright X-ray sources using the lunar occultation technique. In 1973 the observatory part of the mission was added, and mission approval from the European Space Agency Council was given for Helos, now renamed Exosat.

It was decided that the observatory should be made available to a wide community, rather than be restricted to instrument developers, as had been the case for all previous ESA (ESRO) scientific programmes. For the first time in an ESA project, this led to the approach of payload funding and management by the Agency. Instrument design and development became a shared responsibility between ESA and hardware groups.

In July 1981 ESA released the first Announcement of Opportunity (AO) for participation in the Exosat observation programme to the scientific community of its Member States. By 1 November 1981, the closing of the AO window, some 500 observing proposals had been received. Of these, 200 were selected for the first nine months of operation.

Exosat was the first ESA spacecraft to carry on board a digital computer (OBC), with its main purpose being scientific data processing. Spacecraft monitoring and control were secondary. To provide the data handling subsystem with an exceptional flexibility of operation, the OBC and Central Terminal Unit were in-flight reprogrammable. This flexibility far exceeded any other ESA spacecraft built up to then.

It was originally planned to launch on an Ariane 1 but concerns over delays to the rocket resulted in it being transferred to a Thor-Delta.

== Satellite operations ==
Each of the three axes were stabilized and the optical axes of the three scientific instruments were coaligned. The entrance apertures of the scientific instruments were all located on one face of the central body. Once in orbit the flaps which cover the entrances to the ME and LEIT were swung open to act as thermal and stray-light shields for the telescopes and star trackers, respectively.

The orbit of Exosat was different from any previous X-ray astronomy satellite. To maximize the number of sources occulted by the Moon, a highly eccentric orbit (e ~ 0.93) with a 90.6 hr period and an inclination of 73° was chosen. The initial apogee was 191,000 km and perigee 350 km. To be outside the Earth's radiation belts, the scientific instruments were operated above ~50,000 km, giving up to ~76 hr per 90 hr orbit. There was no need for any onboard data storage as Exosat was visible from the ground station at Villafranca, Spain for practically the entire time the scientific instruments were operated.

== Observational results ==
- The detection of quasi-periodic oscillations (QPO) in the X-rays from GX 5-1,
- Pulsations of the X-ray nova EXO 2030+375,
- Detection of Doppler variations in the Fe-line from SS433,
- Discovery of a short 11 minute period in the globular cluster X-ray burster XB 1820-30,
- Spectral survey of 48 Seyfert galaxies over 0.1-10 keV,
- Short-term variability of Active Galactic Nuclei is a common characteristic and
- Discovery of a lack of luminous X-ray clusters at z > 0.1 showing that cluster evolution is strong and continuing.
