= European Space Research Organisation =

International organisation (1964-75); predecessor to the European Space Agency

- Conseil Européen de Recherche Spatiale

Agency overview
- Abbreviation: ESRO
- Formed: 1964
- Type: Space agency
- Headquarters: Paris, France
- Primary spaceports: Esrange, Guiana Space Centre
- Owners: 10 European states: Belgium; Denmark; France; West Germany; Italy; Netherlands; Spain; Sweden; Switzerland; United Kingdom

The European Space Research Organisation (ESRO) was an international organisation founded by 10 European nations with the intention of jointly pursuing scientific research in space. It was founded in 1964. As an organisation ESRO was based on a previously existing international scientific institution, CERN. The ESRO convention, the organisations founding document outlines it as an entity exclusively devoted to scientific pursuits. This was the case for most of its lifetime but in the final years before the formation of ESA, the European Space Agency, ESRO began a programme in the field of telecommunications. Consequently, ESA is not a mainly pure science focused entity but concentrates on telecommunications, earth observation and other application motivated activities. ESRO was merged with ELDO in 1975 to form the European Space Agency.

== Foundation ==
=== European Preparatory Commission for Space Research ===
The origins of a joint European space effort are generally traced back to a number of initiatives taken in 1959 and 1960 by a small group of scientists and science administrators, catalysed by two friends, physicists and scientific statesmen, the Italian Edoardo Amaldi and the Frenchman Pierre Victor Auger. Neither Amaldi nor Auger was a stranger to the cause of scientific collaboration on a European scale. Indeed, it was they who, in the early 1950s, were key actors in the process which led to the setting up of CERN, the European Organization for Nuclear Research.

Now, as the decade drew to a close, they turned their attention to space. Success was rapid. Within a year of the first formal discussions being held amongst scientists, European governments had set up a preparatory commission in order to explore the possibilities for a joint space research effort.

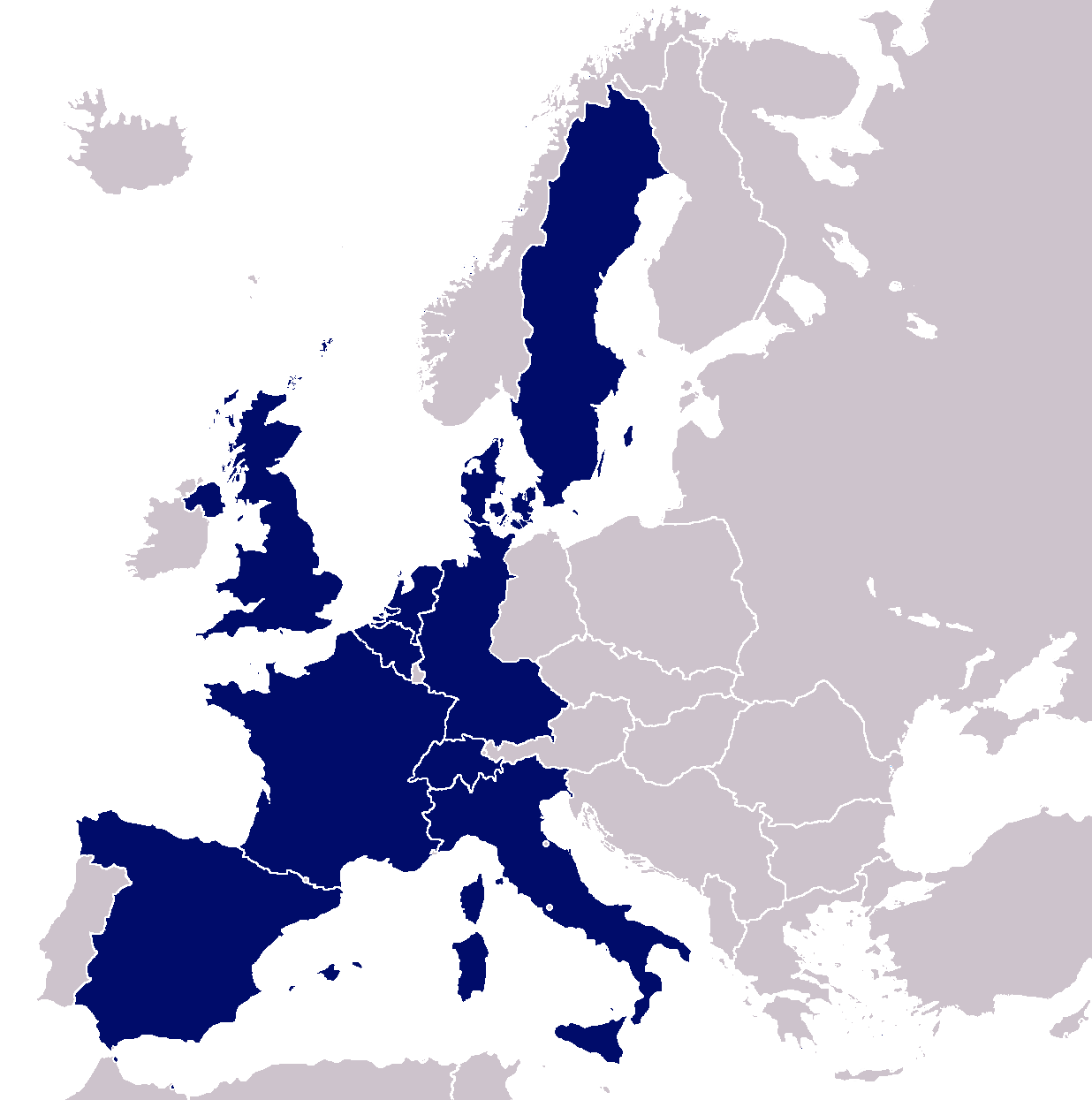
The ten founding members of ESRO

The European Preparatory Commission for Space Research (French: Commission Préparatoire Européenne de Recherche Spatiale, COPERS) held its first session in Paris on 13 and 14 March 1961. Its first task was to create the organs needed to define the scientific programme and the necessary infrastructure of the envisaged organisation, to draw up its budget, and to prepare a Convention for signature by those member state governments who wished to join it. To this end the meeting first elected its "bureau": chairman Harrie Massey, vice-chairmen, Luigi Broglio and Hendrik van de Hulst, and executive secretary Pierre Auger, all men who had played an important role in the debates in 1960 and, Auger apart, still active and eminent European space scientists. It then established two working groups.

The first was the Interim Scientific and Technical Working Group and its task was to prepare the scientific programme for the future space organisation, paying particular attention to the technical and financial implications of its proposals. Lamek Hulthén, from the Royal Institute of Technology in Stockholm, was nominated chairman of this group; Reimar Lüst from the Max Planck Institute for Physics in Garching, Germany was appointed its coordinating secretary.

The second was the Legal, Administrative and Financial Working Group. Its chairman was initially left open, though it was recommended that he be someone from the German Federal Republic. Alexander Hocker, a senior bureaucrat from Bad-Godesberg who was the chairman of the CERN Finance Committee at the time, took on this task. All Member States were to be represented on both working groups, which were empowered to set up subgroups to facilitate their work.

==== The Blue Book ====
By the third meeting of COPERS on 24 and 25 October 1961 in Munich, the Interim Scientific and Technical Working Group had prepared a 77-page document outlining the future European Space Research Organisation. The so-called "Blue Book" was divided into five parts, each devoted to one of the following subjects:

1. a general outline of ESRO
2. ESRO's scientific programme
3. its technology centre
4. data handling
5. ranges and vehicles

The Blue Book foresaw the firing of some 435 sounding rockets and the successful development and launching of 17 satellites in the 8 years covered by the ESRO Convention, namely 11 small satellites, 4 space probes, and 2 large satellites. It was assumed that 2 launchings would be required to orbit one successful spacecraft, so the number of satellite and space probes launchings budgeted for was doubled. The total cost of the satellite programme was estimated at 733.5 million ₣, of which 450 million ₣ was for launchers and launch operations and 283.5 million ₣ for spacecraft development.

The Blue Book was more a manifesto of interests and expectations than a concrete working hypothesis. It only reflected the intentions and hopes of important sectors of the European scientific community while ignoring their lack of capacity to fulfill these intentions. The fact that transforming the manifesto into a true operational programme would be a long and laborious process and the results sometimes disappointing.

== Organisation and functioning ==
=== The Auger years (1964–67) ===
The ESRO Convention entered into force on 20 March 1964. The ten founding states were Belgium, Denmark, France, (Federal Republic of) Germany, Italy, Netherlands, Spain, Sweden, Switzerland and the United Kingdom. Two other countries which had participated in the early COPERS activities, Austria and Norway, decided not to join the new organisation but retained an observer status. The first meeting of the Council opened in Paris three days later with Harrie Massey in the chair. Pierre Auger was appointed ESRO's first Director General.

==== Legislative arm ====
At the decision making level (the "Legislative" in the ESRO jargon), the supreme governing body was the council, made of delegations from its Member States. Each member state had one vote in the council, where it could be represented by not more than two delegates, one of whom was generally a scientist, the other an important national science administrator. One or more advisers were usually included national delegations. The main tasks of the council were to determine the Organisation's scientific, technical and administrative policy; to approve its programme and annual work plans; and to determine its level of resources both annually, and every third year for the subsequent three-year period. The council was advised by two subordinate bodies, the Administrative and Finance Committee (AFC) and the Scientific and Technical Committee (STC).

==== Executive arm ====
At the executive level, ESRO was managed by a Directorate based in Paris, including the Director General assisted by a Scientific Director, a Technical Director and a Head of Administration . The directors of ESRIN, ESDAC and ESLAB reported to the Scientific Director; the director of ESTEC, who had also responsibility for ESRANGE and ESTRACK, reported to the Technical Director. The "Executive", as it was eventually called, was responsible for the implementation of approved programmes within the established financial envelope and under general control from the Scientific and Technical Committee. It was also called to perform feasibility studies of space missions proposals coming from the scientific community and recommended by the STC, in view of their eventual adoption in the programme.

=== The Bannier report and its consequences ===
Only two years after the formation of ESRO, problems with its structure became painfully obvious. By mid-1966 it had climbed to 50%, placing enormous pressure on the operational programme. For this reason the Council set up a group of experts led by J.H. Bannier to investigate and solve the problem. Bannier quickly relieved the pressure on the AFC by raising the limit below which the Executive could award contracts without having to seek committee approval. He further increased the role of the Executive by transferring certain competencies from the Legislative to the Directorate. But this was only a stop-gap measure.

Bannier realised that the entire structure of ESOC had to be changed. Firstly, they were emphatic that the executive function of the organisation should be clearly separated from the policy and the planning function. Secondly, as far as the scientific programme was concerned, they recommended that there be a clear institutional distinction drawn between spacecraft development and spacecraft operation after launch. To achieve these objectives, the Bannier group suggested that ESRO's top management structure be completely changed. The dichotomy between scientific and technical directorates was, in Bannier's view, wrong in principle for an organisation like ESRO. To overcome it, he suggested that the two posts be abolished. In its stead a new structure was proposed. It comprised the Director General (DG) plus four directors, two of whom were essentially responsible for policy-making and two for policy execution. A new post was to be created in the first category, a so-called Director of Programmes and Planning (DPP), whose task it would be to prepare draft programmes of the Organisation, based on the scientific, technical, financial and time implications of the different proposals. The second member of the directorate concerned with forward planning would be the Director of Administration (DA) whose task it would be to prepare policy on the future needs of personnel, finance and contracts, and to organise and implement the necessary procedures to maintain an a posteriori control over the Organisation's functioning. The two posts in the Directorate having executive authority would be filled by the director of ESTEC and of ESDAC, which was to be renamed ESOC, the European Space Operations Centre. As for ESRIN, the Bannier group judged its research to be marginal to the major activities of the Organisation. Its director, they felt, should not be a member of the directorate but should rather report directly to the DG.

== Facilities and establishments ==
=== European Space Research and Technology Centre ===
Dutch newsreel including footage of ESTEC

The European Space Research and Technology Centre (ESTEC) was to be a facility at the very core of ESRO. Its responsibilities included the engineering and testing of satellites and their payloads, the integration of scientific instruments in these payloads, and making arrangements for their launch. In some cases member states were to produce the scientific instruments for ESRO or produce them as part of their own national effort and compensate ESTEC for its service. In practise, national organisations simply used ESTEC as a service organisation and left it to pay for their efforts from the ESRO budget. After the Bannier Report the facility gained overall executive authority for spacecraft development and was merged with ESLAB. The satellite control centre was also moved to ESOC. ESTEC was originally to be located in Delft (Holland) but because of unforeseen difficulties, Noordwijk was chosen instead.

=== ESLAB ===
The situation with ESRO's laboratory, ESLAB was similar. It lacked the staff to function as an independent organisation. But this wasn't surprising since the ESRO Convention describes ESLAB's role in the following manner: "...to undertake joint research programmes on the minimum scale deemed necessary by the Council [...] to complete or complement the scientific studies carried out in Member States."

This meant that ESLAB was little more than a venue for visiting scientists. ESLAB's role was later expanded. It acted as the interface between national scientific groups and ESTEC engineering groups as well as conducted its own research within the scope of the large astronomical satellite project. After the Bannier Report ESLAB was merged with ESTEC.

=== ESRANGE ===
In 1964 ESRANGE was established as an ESRO sounding rocket launching range located in Kiruna (Sweden). This location was chosen because it was important to carry out a sounding rocket programme in the auroral zone, and essential that ESRO equip itself with a suitable range in the northern latitudes. Access to Kiruna was good by air, road and rail, and the launching range was relatively close to the town of Kiruna. Finally and perhaps decisively, ESRANGE could be located near Kiruna Geophysical Observatory (subsequently renamed the Swedish Institute of Space Physics). In 1972 ownership and operations of the range was transferred to the Swedish Space Corporation.

=== ESTRACK and ESDAC ===
Space science data handling has two aspects. Firstly, it requires the setting up of a network of tracking and telemetry stations which can receive signals from spacecraft (ESTRACK). This network comprised four stations situated in the following locations:

- Redu (Belgium)
- Fairbanks (Alaska)
- Spitsbergen (Norway)
- Falkland Islands

Secondly, it requires a central facility which edits and processes the information from the tracking network. The facilities at the centre, initially labelled ESDAC (European Space Data Acquisition Centre), were essentially a large mainframe computer or computers, which wAS made available both to its in-house staff and to visiting scientists and fellows who wished to use them to analyse and study the recovered data. ESDAC was later renamed ESOC, the European Space Operations Centre. ESOC is located in Darmstadt (Germany). After the Bannier Report it gained overall executive authority for spacecraft operation. ESOC's director also became responsible for ESRANGE and for ESTRACK.

=== ESLAR ===
ESLAR, a laboratory for advanced research was created in 1966 mainly to break the political deadlock over the location of ESLAB. Later renamed ESRIN, and acronym for European Space Research Institute, ESLAR was based in Frascati (Italy). The ESRO Convention describes ESRINs' role in the following manner: "...to undertake laboratory and theoretical research in the basic physics and chemistry necessary to the understanding of past and the planning of future experiments in space." The facility began acquiring data from environmental satellites in the 1970s.

=== ESRO headquarters ===
ESRO headquarters was home to the Executive arm of ESRO. After the Bannier Report it became responsible for policy, planning and a posteriori control.

== Scientific activities ==
The ESRO convention outlined the organisation as one which would be solely devoted to space science. As a consequence, scientific work was the main area of ESROs early operations. As the organisation and its capabilities matured it shifted from a strictly scientific programme to one where applicational activities played a more dominant role.

=== Sounding rockets ===
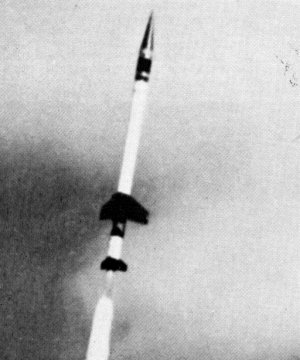
The British Skylark was one of the main sounding rockets used by ESRO.

The fact that sounding rockets are relatively inexpensive, have a short lead time, provide a test bed for more ambitious project and have a low risk of failure made them an ideal first project for the newly formed European Space Research Organisation.

The first two ESRO sounding rockets were launches from the Salto di Quirra range in Sardinia on 6 and 8 July 1964. They released a payload of barium and ammonia into the ionosphere. The first launch from ESRANGE was made in November 1966. From this point onward the frequency of sounding rocket launches increased dramatically. The Norwegian base in Andøya was also used as a launch site.

The British Skylark (83) and French Centaure (64) were the main rockets utilised for the programme. The American Arcas (14), French Bélier (4) and Dragon (2), British Petrel (1) and German/Swiss Zenit (1) were also used. In total, the program oversaw the launch of 168 sounding rockets with an average success rate of 75%. During the course of the programme, the size and payload of the sounding rockets used by ESRO increased from 2.7 to 5.55 m (in length) and from 140 to 310 kg respectively.

About half of the 168 sounding rockets were dedicated to ionospheric and auroral studies, about a quarter to atmospheric physics and the rest to solar, stellar and gamma-ray studies. While the number of launched rockets was lower than foreseen, the project exceeded expectations due to higher than anticipated payload capacity and longer range of the rockets.

=== Original satellite programme ===
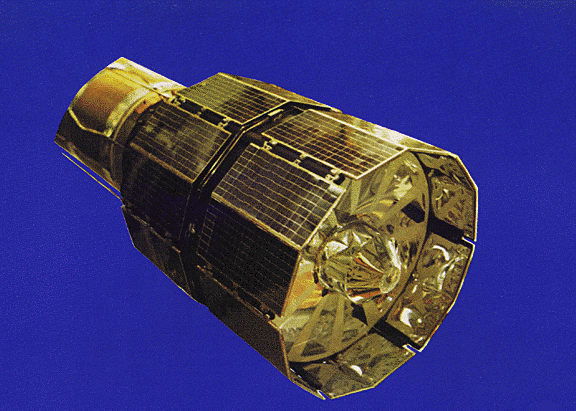
ESRO-2B or Iris was the first successful ESRO satellite launch

The Blue Book foresaw the launching of 11 small satellites, 4 space probes, and 2 large satellites. These ambitions were never realized mainly due to financial troubles. The programme went through many revisions and in the end only a handful of projects produced concrete results. These were the two small, non-stabilised satellites ESRO I and ESRO II, launched in 1968 and renamed after launch Aurorae and Iris respectively; the two small highly eccentric orbit satellites HEOS-A and HEOS-A2, launched in 1968 and 1972 and then renamed HEOS-1 and HEOS-2; the medium size, stabilised satellite TD-1, launched in 1972; and the small satellite ESRO IV, also launched in 1972, which replaced the second satellite of the TD series (TD-2). All of these were multi-experiment satellites, i.e. the spacecraft carried a payload comprising several instruments provided by different research groups.

==== ESRO I and ESRO II ====
These were small, non-stabilised spacecraft, carrying very simple experiments designed to measure the radiation environment around the spacecraft. They represented the direct satellite descendants of the experience gained with the sounding rocket experiments. ESRO I's origin in the sounding rocket programme was particularly obvious. It studied auroral phenomena and the polar ionosphere. ESRO II was dedicated to the fields of solar astronomy and cosmic rays. Sometimes the two satellites are also referred to as ESRO-1A (or Aurora) and ESRO-2B (or Iris) respectively.

==== HEOS 1 and HEOS 2 ====
HEOS 1, with the earlier name HEOS-A, was the first highly eccentric orbit satellite was designed to make measurements of plasma, magnetic field and cosmic ray particles. There were disagreements over the cost of this project. Since the existing ESTRACK grid had been designed with low orbit satellites in mind it would be insufficient for tracking and receiving data form a satellite in a highly eccentric (escape) orbit. A solution was found in the form of upgrading an ELDO facility in Australia and integrating it at a relatively low cost. HEOS 1 was launched on December 5, 1968 from Cape Canaveral with a Delta E-1 rocket. Instruments were a magnetometer, particle detectors and a barium cloud release cannister.
HEOS 2 was launched on 31. January 1972 from Vandenberg AFB with a Delta rocket. Instruments were a magnetometer, particle detectors and a dust detector replacing the barium cloud release cannister.

==== Thor-Delta programme ====
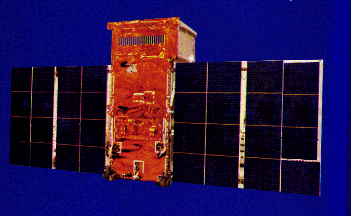
TD-1A was Europe's first 3-axis stabilized satellite

Named after the workhorse medium launch system used by ESRO at the time, the Thor–Delta, the TD programme initially foresaw the launch of 3 satellites: TD-1, TD-2 and TD-3. TD-1 was devoted to stellar astronomy, TD-2 was to be devoted to solar astronomy while TD-3 was to study the ionosphere. Later TD-2 and 3 were merged to save funds. But subsequent financial difficulties and political disagreements led to the abandonment of the TD-2/TD-3 spacecraft. Later some of the experiments destined for launch aboard the TD-2/TD-3 were flown on the ESRO IV satellite.

==== LAS ====
The Large Astronomical Satellite (LAS) was to be an orbiting observatory with the mission of providing basic knowledge about celestial objects through the use of a high-resolution ultraviolet spectrometer. The project started in the late 1950s and was cancelled in 1968 because of the lack of financial support and political squabbles.

=== Second generation satellites ===
==== COS-B ====
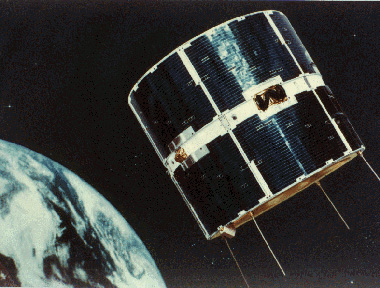
Cos-B, a satellite to study cosmic gamma-rays

The first successful ESRO science satellite was COS-B. The mission was first proposed by the scientific community in the mid 1960s, approved in 1969 and launched in 1975. It was shut off in 1982 after contributing a great deal of scientific data on cosmic gamma rays, which continues to be analysed today. This was the first ESRO satellite which carried only one experiment.

==== GEOS ====
GEOS was a geostationary multi-experiment satellite dedicated to magnetospheric research. The instruments for this project were provided by multiple European institutions. When GEOS was launched in 1977, the launcher malfunctioned and the planned orbit was not achieved. A modified qualification model of the same payload was successfully launched in 1978 and remained in operation until 1982 when it was turned off.

=== First package deal ===
This was the name of a policy shift negotiated by ESRO members in 1971 which drastically reduced scientific funding in favor of application activities doubling the overall budget. This first lead to a change in the administrative structure and a 50% reduction of the scientific staff. Given the new budgetary environment, LPAC had to choose which two missions to fly among the five which had been planned thus far. It eventually chose HELOS, renamed Exosat, and the IMP-D, renamed ISEE-2, projects.

==== Exosat ====
The European X-ray Observatory Satellite (EXOSAT), originally named "HELOS", was operational from May 1983 until April 1986 and in that time made 1780 observations in the X-ray band of most classes of astronomical objects.

==== ISEE-2 ====
This satellite was the second of three International Sun-Earth Explorer (ISEE) spacecraft. The project was a cooperative effort between NASA and ESRO (later ESA) designed to study the interaction between the Earth's magnetic field and the solar wind. The program used three spacecraft, a mother/daughter pair (ISEE-1 and ISEE-2) and a heliocentric spacecraft (ISEE-3, later renamed International Cometary Explorer). The instruments on board ISEE-2 were designed to measure electric and magnetic field properties. ISEE-2 was launched in October 1977, and re-entered in September 1987. ISEE-1 (a.k.a. Explorer 56) and ISEE-3 were built by NASA, while ISEE-2 was by ESA. The space probes had complementary instruments supported by the same group of over 100 scientists. At least 32 institutions were involved, and the focus was on understanding magnetic fields. ISEE-1 and ISEE-2 remained near the Earth, while ISEE-3 went into a heliocentric orbit.

=== Second package deal ===
This new ESRO policy, negotiated in 1973, gave the organisation overall responsibility for the development of the European Ariane launcher. This task was entrusted to CNES. The second package deal enabled ESRO to enter into cooperation with NASA on the Spacelab project as well as manage the MAROTS maritime satellite navigation project. This agreement made funding easier and more flexible for the contributing nations which led to a doubling of the organisation's overall budget. ESRO also participated in the International Ultraviolet Explorer mission with NASA under these policy guidelines.

== Telecommunications Satellite Programme ==
The first step towards a telecommunications program within ESRO was made in the end of 1966 when the European Conference on Satellite Communications requested that the organisation examine the potential for a European telecom satellite project. Although studies were carried out at this early stage as well as during the subsequent 5 years the ESRO council would not approve research and development activities until 1971 when the first package deal took effect. The delay was due to ESROs rigid decision making structure and the unfavorable political situation which existed among ESRO members at the time. These problems were largely done away with as part of the 1971 policy change which, among other things, outlined a fully voluntary mechanism for application project financing. Under the first package deal ESRO pursued a project to establish a European satellite system by the early 1980s in partnership with the European Conference of Postal and Telecommunications Administrations and the European Broadcasting Union. ESRO merged with ELDO to form the European Space Agency in 1975 before the first satellite of the effort, the Orbital Test Satellite, would be successfully launched in 1978.

== Literature ==
- ESA History Advisory Committee: A history of the European Space Agency 1958–1987, Volume 1: The story of ESRO and ELDO (=ESA special publication 1235). European Space Agency 2001, ISBN 92-9092-536-1, ISSN 1609-042X
