= ISEE-2 =

Space probe used to study magnetic fields

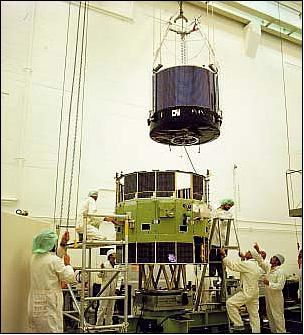
- ISEE-1 and ISEE-2 satellites at Kennedy Space Center
- Names: ISEE-B; International Sun-Earth Explorer-B; IMP-K Prime
- Mission type: Space physics
- Operator: NASA / ESA
- COSPAR ID: 1977-102B
- SATCAT no.: 10423
- Mission duration: 10 years (achieved)

Spacecraft properties
- Spacecraft: ISEE-2
- Spacecraft type: International Sun-Earth Explorer
- Bus: IMP (Interplanetary Monitoring Platform)
- Manufacturer: Dornier Systems
- Launch mass: 165.78 kg (365.5 lb)
- Dimensions: Cylinder at 16 sided of 1.27 m (4 ft 2 in) of diameter and of 1.14 m (3 ft 9 in) in height
- Power: 112 watts

Start of mission
- Launch date: 22 October 1977, 13:53:00 UTC
- Rocket: Thor-Delta 2914 (Thor 623 / Delta 135)
- Launch site: Cape Canaveral, LC-17B
- Contractor: Douglas Aircraft Company
- Entered service: 22 October 1977

End of mission
- Last contact: 26 September 1987
- Decay date: 26 September 1987

Orbital parameters
- Reference system: Geocentric orbit
- Regime: High Earth orbit
- Perigee altitude: 1.04 R_{e} (6,600 km (4,100 mi))
- Apogee altitude: 23.00 R_{e} (137,806 km (85,629 mi))
- Inclination: 28.76°
- Period: 3556.80 minutes

Instruments
- Electron and Proton Fluxes in the Outer Magnetosphere (1.5-300 keV); Fast Plasma Experiment (FPE); Low-Energy Proton and Electron Differential Energy Analyzer (LEPEDEA); Medium Energy Particles Experiment (METE); Plasma (Total Electron) Density by Radio Techniques; Plasma waves: electric and magnetic fields spectra (5.62 Hz - 31.1 kHz); Solar Wind Ions Distribution; Tri-axial Fluxgate Magnetometer
- International Sun-Earth Explorer

The ISEE-2 (International Sun-Earth Explorer-2, International Sun-Earth Explorer-B or ISEE-B) was part of the mother/daughter/heliocentric mission (ISEE-1, ISEE-2, ISEE-3). ISEE-2, an Explorer-class daughter spacecraft, was a 165.78 kg (365.5 lb) space probe used to study magnetic fields near the Earth. ISEE-2 was a spin-stabilized spacecraft and based on the design of the prior IMP (Interplanetary Monitoring Platform) series of spacecraft. ISEE-1 and ISEE-2 were launched on 22 October 1977, and they re-entered on 26 September 1987.

The program was a cooperative mission between NASA and ESRO (later European Space Agency (ESA)), a memorandum of understanding (MOU) between NASA and the European Space Agency, was signed in March 1975. The program was designed to study the interaction between the Earth's magnetic field and the solar wind. At least 32 institutions were involved, and the focus was on understanding magnetic fields. ISEE-1 and ISEE-3 were built by NASA, while ISEE-2 was built by ESA. All three had complementary instruments supported by the same group of over 100 scientists.

== Mission ==
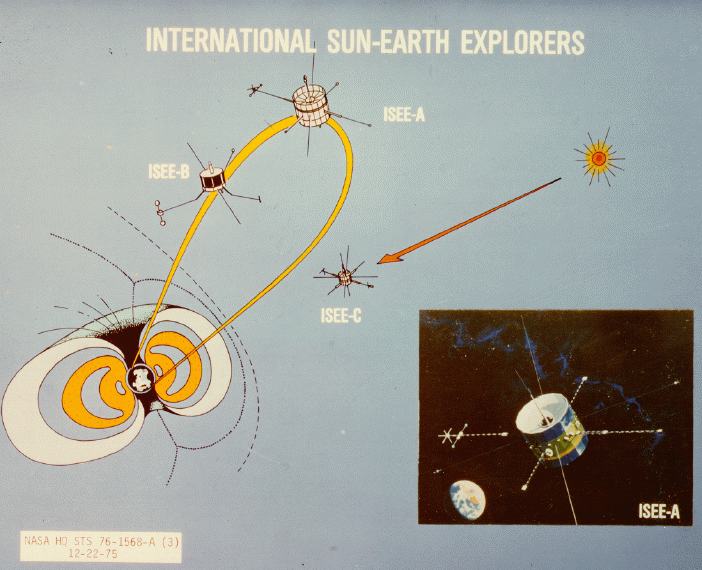
International Sun Earth Explorers Orbits

The purposes of the mission were: (1) to investigate solar-terrestrial relationships at the outermost boundaries of the Earth's magnetosphere, (2) to examine in detail the structure of the solar wind near the Earth and the shock wave that forms the interface between the solar wind and the Earth's magnetosphere, (3) to investigate motions of and mechanisms operating in the plasma sheets, and (4) to continue the investigation of cosmic rays and solar flare effects in the interplanetary region near 1 AU. The three spacecraft carried a number of complementary instruments for making measurements of plasmas, energetic particles, waves, and fields. The mission thus extended the investigations of previous IMP spacecraft. The mother/daughter portion of the mission consisted of two spacecraft (ISEE-1 and ISEE-2) with station-keeping capability in the same highly eccentric geocentric orbit with an apogee of 23 Earth radii (R_{e}). During the course of the mission, the ISEE-1 and ISEE-2 orbit parameters underwent short-term and long-term variations due to solar and lunar perturbations. These two spacecraft maintained a small separation distance, and made simultaneous coordinated measurements to permit separation of spatial from temporal irregularities in the near-Earth solar wind, the bow shock, and inside the magnetosphere. By maneuvering ISEE-2, the inter-spacecraft separation as measured near the Earth's bow shock was allowed to vary between 10 km (6.2 mi) and 5,000 km (3,100 mi); its value is accurately known as a function of time and orbital position.

== Spacecraft ==
ISEE-2 was a cylinder at 16 sided of 1.27 m (4 ft 2 in) of diameter and of 1.14 m (3 ft 9 in) in height. ISEE-2 had a thruster to adjust the spacing between the two spacecraft, depending on desired goal. Early results from duo stated that by having two spacecraft, the "spatial and temporal variations in the magnetosphere and solar wind" could be detected.

The spacecraft were spin stabilized, with the spin vectors maintained nominally within 1° of perpendicular to the ecliptic plane, pointing north. The spin rates were nominally 19.75 rpm for ISEE-1 and 19.8 rpm for ISEE-2, so that there was a slow differential rotation between the two spacecraft. The ISEE-2 body-mounted solar array supplied approximately 112 watts at launch. The ISEE-2 data rate was 2048 bit/s most of the time and 8192 bit/s during one orbit out of every five (with some exceptions).

== Experiments ==
=== Electron and Proton Fluxes in the Outer Magnetosphere (1.5-300 keV) ===
This experiment was designed to determine, by using identical instrumentation on the mother/daughter spacecraft, the spatial extent, propagation velocity, and temporal behavior of a wide variety of particle phenomena. Electrons were measured at 2 and 6 keV and in two bands: 8 to 200 keV and 30 to 200 keV. Protons were measured at 2 and 6 KeV and in three bands: 8 to 200 keV, 30 to 200 keV, and 200 to 380 keV. The 30 keV threshold could be commanded to 15 or 60 keV. Identical instrumentation on each spacecraft consisted of a pair of surface-barrier, semiconductor detector telescopes (one with a foil and one without a foil) and four fixed-voltage electrostatic analyzers (two for electrons and two for protons). Channel multipliers were used as detectors with the fixed-voltage analyzers. The telescopes had a viewing cone with a 40° half-angle, oriented at about 20° to the spin axis.

=== Fast Plasma Experiment (FPE) ===
This experiment was designed to study plasma velocity distributions and their spatial and temporal variations in the solar wind, bow shock, magnetosheath, magnetopause, and magnetotail (within the magnetosphere). One-, two-, and three-dimensional velocity distributions for positive ions and electrons were measured using two 90° spherical electrostatic analyzers with channeltron electron multipliers as detectors. In conjunction with similar instrumentation (1977-102A-01) for the mother spacecraft, protons from 50 eV to 40 keV (and electrons from 5 eV to 20 keV) were measured with 10% energy resolution in two ranges each.

=== Low-Energy Proton and Electron Differential Energy Analyzer (LEPEDEA) ===
This experiment was designed to study, by means of identical instrumentation on the mother/daughter spacecraft, the spatial and temporal variations of the solar wind and magnetosheath electrons and ions. Protons and electrons in the energy range from 1 eV to 45 keV were measured in 64 contiguous energy bands with an energy resolution (delta E/E) of 0.16. A quadrispherical low-energy proton and electron differential energy analyzer (LEPEDEA), employing seven continuous-channel electron multipliers in each of its two (one for protons and one for electrons) electrostatic analyzers was flown on both the mother and the daughter spacecraft. All but 2% of the 4 pi-sr solid angle was covered for particle-velocity vectors. A Geiger–Müller tube was also included, with a conical field of view of 40° full-angle, perpendicular to the spin axis. This detector was sensitive to electrons with E>45 keV, and to protons with E>600 keV.

=== Medium Energy Particles Experiment (METE) ===
This experiment was designed to identify and to study plasma instabilities responsible for acceleration, source and loss mechanisms, and boundary and interface phenomena throughout the orbital range of the mother/daughter satellites. A proton telescope and an electron spectrometer were flown on each spacecraft to measure detailed energy spectra and angular distributions. These detectors used silicon, surface-barrier, totally depleted, solid-state devices of various thicknesses, areas, and configurations. Protons in 5 directions and 12 energy channels between 20 keV and 2 MeV and electrons in 5 directions and 12 energy channels between 20 keV and 300 keV (to 1.2 MeV for the 90° direction) were measured. Data were accumulated in up to 32 sectors per spin.

=== Plasma (Total Electron) Density by Radio Techniques ===
The total electron content between the mother and daughter was obtained by measuring the phase delay introduced by the ambient plasma onto a wave of frequency about 683-kHz, transmitted from the mother (experiment -08) and received on the daughter. The phase was compared against a phase-coherent signal transmitted from the mother to the daughter by modulation onto a carrier of frequency high enough (272.5-MHz) to be unaffected by the ambient plasma.

=== Plasma waves: electric and magnetic fields spectra (5.62 Hz - 31.1 kHz) ===
In this experiment, a single-axis search coil magnetometer with a high permeability core and two electric field dipoles (30 m (98 ft) tip-to-tip and 0.61 m (2 ft 0 in)) measured wave phenomena occurring within the magnetosphere and solar wind in conjunction with a similar experiment (1977-102A-07) flown on the mother spacecraft. The antennas were mounted perpendicularly to the spin axis. The instrumentation was composed of two elements: (1) a high-time-resolution spectrum analyzer with 16 frequency channels (identical to those on ISEE 1) from 5.62-Hz to 31.1-kHz where all channels were sampled 1 or 4 times per seconds, depending on bit rate; and (2) a wide-band receiver to condition electric and magnetic waveforms for transmission to the ground via the special-purpose analog transmitter. There were two basic frequency channels, from 10-Hz to 1-kHz and from 650-Hz to 10-kHz. In addition, the frequency range could be shifted by a frequency-conversion scheme to any of eight ranges up to 2.0-MHz.

=== Solar Wind Ions Distribution ===
This instrument was designed to measure the angular distributions and energy spectra of positive ions in the solar wind. The main region of interest was outward from and including the magnetopause (greater than 8 earth radii). Two hemispherical electrostatic analyzers were used to cover the energy range 100 eV to 10 keV/Q in up to 64 energy channels. There were two operating modes: one for high-time resolution and one for high-energy resolution. Energy levels were kept constant through a complete spacecraft revolution.

=== Tri-axial Fluxgate Magnetometer ===
The magnetic fields investigation selected for ISEE-1 and ISEE-2 had as its principal objectives the study of the magnetic signatures of magnetospheric phenomena and magnetohydrodynamic waves in and around the magnetosphere, and to provide supporting data for other experiments on the spacecraft such as the electric field, particle and plasma wave investigations. In this triaxial fluxgate magnetometer, three ring-core sensors in an orthogonal triad were enclosed in a flipper mechanism at the end of the magnetometer boom. The electronics unit was on the main body of the spacecraft at the foot of the boom. The magnetometer had two operating ranges of ± 8192 nT and ± 256 nT in each vector component. The data were digitized and averaged within the instrument to provide increased resolution and to provide Nyquist filtering. There were two modes for the transmission of the averaged data. In the double-precision mode of operation, 16-bit samples of data were transmitted. This provided a maximum resolution of ± 1/4 nT or 1/128 nT in the low-sensitivity and high-sensitivity ranges. Operation of this experiment was near nominal until spacecraft re-entry on 26 September 1987. Users of data from this experiment should be aware of the fact that the averaging of 12-bit samples to create 16-bit samples worked well in the spin plane, but in situations during which the field along the spin axis was quiet relative to the size of a digital window, the magnetometer returned only a 12-bit sample. This was particularly noticeable when the spacecraft was in the solar wind and the instrument was operated in its low gain (8192 nT) range, and when the spacecraft was in quiet regions of the magnetosphere in the low gain mode. The former situation limited the resolution of the field measured to 4 nT in the double precision mode in which the magnetometer usually was operated, and the latter situation created, as the spacecraft moved through the large gradient in the Earth's magnetic field, a stairstep pattern of field changes of size 4 nT which may be mistaken for waves. Another operational anomaly was the saturation of a sensor during gain changes. At these times, the 3 components of the magnetic field were deduced from one spin tone and the field along the spin axis, limiting the temporal resolution of the instrument to below the spin frequency. Every effort was made to minimize zero level errors, clerical errors and other data processing anomalies within the available resources. However, these resources were very constrained and funding ceased before the entire submitted data set could be checked.

== Orbit ==
ISEE-1 and ISEE-2 remained near the Earth. ISEE-3 was the first spacecraft to be placed in a halo orbit at the Earth-Sun Lagrange point L_{1} and it was later deployed into a heliocentric orbit.

== Atmospheric entry ==
Both ISEE-1 and ISEE-2 re-entered the Earth's atmosphere during orbit 1518 on 26 September 1987. Seventeen of 21 on-board experiments were operational at the end.

== See also ==
- ISEE-1
- ISEE-3
- International Cometary Explorer (ISEE-3 launched in 1978)
- List of heliophysics missions
- European Space Research Organisation
- Van Allen Probes
