= Institute of Statistics and Economic Studies =

The Institute of Statistics and Economic Studies - New Caledonia (ISEE-NC) (French: Institut de la Statistique et des Études Économiques-Nouvelle-Calédonie) is a public institution in New Caledonia that collects, produces and analyzes statistical information.
