= Cos-B =

European space mission

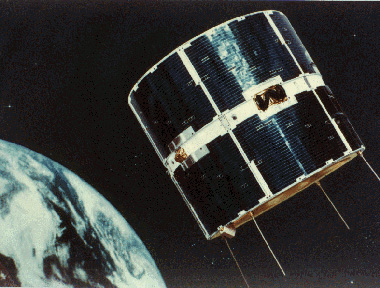
- Cos-B, a satellite to study cosmic gamma-rays
- Mission type: Astronomy
- Operator: ESA
- COSPAR ID: 1975-072A
- SATCAT no.: 08062
- Mission duration: 2.5 years (planned); 6 years, 8 months and 15 days (achieved)

Spacecraft properties
- Launch mass: 277,5 kg
- Payload mass: 118 kg

Start of mission
- Launch date: 9 August 1975, 01:48:00 UTC
- Rocket: Delta 2913
- Launch site: Vandenberg Air Force Base, SLC-2W

End of mission
- Disposal: deorbited
- Deactivated: 25 April 1982
- Decay date: 18 January 1986

Orbital parameters
- Reference system: Geocentric orbit
- Regime: Low Earth orbit
- Legacy ESA insignia (2020s)

COS-B (Celestial Observation Satellite B) was the first European Space Research Organisation (ESRO) mission to study cosmic gamma ray sources. COS-B was first put forward by the European scientific community in the mid-1960s and approved by the ESRO council in 1969. The mission consisted of a satellite containing gamma-ray detectors, which was launched by NASA on behalf of the ESRO on 9 August 1975. The mission was completed on 25 April 1982, after the satellite had been operational for more than 6.5 years, four years longer than planned and had increased the amount of data on gamma rays by a factor of 25. Scientific results included the 2CG Catalogue listing around 25 gamma ray sources and a map of the Milky Way. The satellite also observed the X-ray binary Cygnus X-3.

== Launch ==
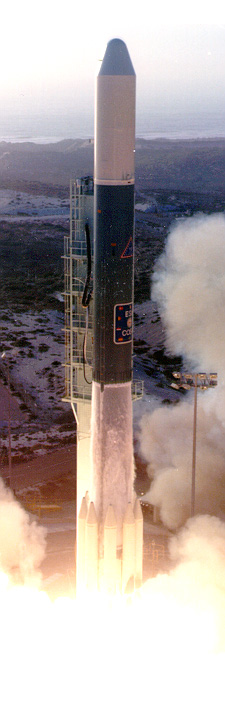
The launch of COS-B from Vandenberg Air Force Base.

COS-B was launched from Vandenberg Air Force Base on 9 August 1975 on a Delta 2913 rocket.
