= MIT Radiation Laboratory Series =

Technical books on microwave radar technologies (1946-1951)

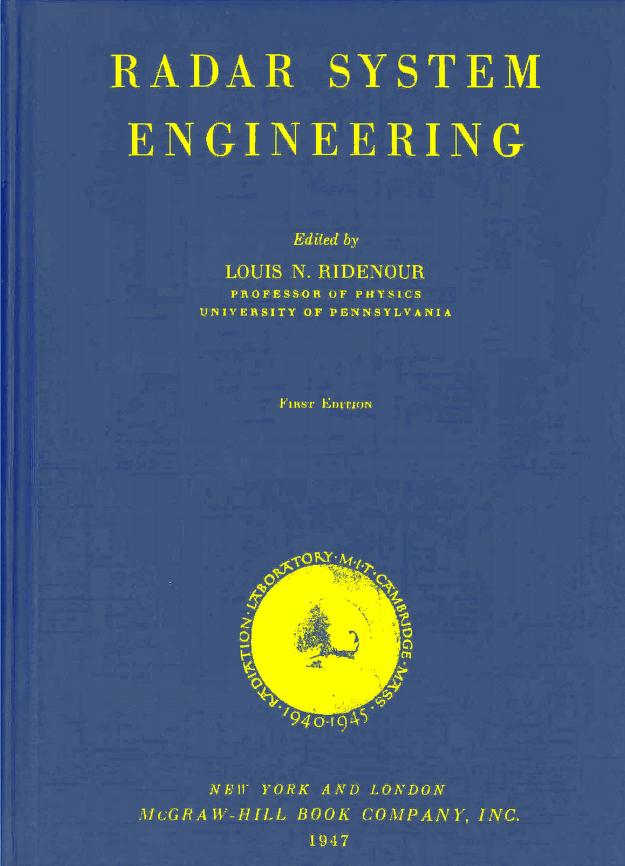
- First edition cover of Volume 1
- Edited by: Louis Ridenour (editor-in-chief); Avis M. Clarke
- Country: United States
- Language: English
- Discipline: Microwave engineering, radar, electronics
- Publisher: McGraw-Hill
- Published: 1947–1951
- Media type: Print (hardcover)
- No. of books: 28
- OCLC: 6748386

The MIT Radiation Laboratory Series is a 28-volume collection of technical books on microwave electronics and radar technology, published by McGraw-Hill between 1947 and 1951. Produced under the general editorship of Louis Ridenour, more than fifty volume editors, and hundreds of contributing authors and technical staff, the series documented research conducted at the MIT Radiation Laboratory during World War II.

The volumes became foundational texts for postwar electronics, influencing the development of microwave engineering, control systems engineering, and semiconductor physics. Because the Series was produced with federal funds, its publication contract returned royalties to the United States Treasury and limited McGraw-Hill's copyright to ten years per volume, after which the content entered the public domain. The series is credited with disseminating wartime radar technology to academic and industrial researchers who would otherwise have lacked access to it.

== Background ==
The Radiation Laboratory, established in 1940, was the principal center for Allied microwave radar development during World War II. Over five years, the laboratory grew to employ nearly 4,000 people working on several continents. Half of all radar systems deployed by the U.S. military during the war were designed there, comprising over 100 different systems. MIT became the largest university contractor for the Office of Scientific Research and Development (OSRD), with 94 percent of its wartime funding supporting radar research at the Radiation Laboratory. Research staff at MIT worked closely with industrial scientists and production engineers at major technology manufacturers including Sperry Gyroscope, General Electric, RCA, Westinghouse, each of which received separate or subordinate OSRD contracts. The largest of these external contracts was with Bell Telephone Laboratories, the captive research arm of the telecommunications giant Western Electric.

In the fall of 1944, Rad Lab associate director Isidor Rabi recognized that while basic science had stalled during the war, five years of intensive radar research had produced advances equivalent to roughly twenty years of normal progression in fields including crystal theory, antenna design, radio signal propagation, and microwave circuitry. As an emergency operation, plans to demobilize the Rad Lab were already underway. Rabi was concerned that without systematic documentation, Bell Labs would remain the sole repository of this knowledge after the Rad Lab dispersed.

== Production ==
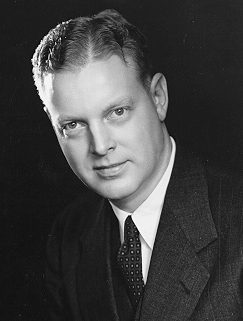
Louis Ridenour, editor-in-chief

Work began in late 1944 under Ridenour's editorship. The project encountered resistance from staff members who objected to writing duties while combat continued; during the Battle of the Bulge in December 1944, some confronted Rabi directly about the apparent misallocation of effort. Rabi temporarily left for Los Alamos to avoid the criticism.

After the surrender of Japan, opposition evaporated. Approximately 250 Rad Lab staff remained to work as editors and authors, supported by teams of stenographers and proofreaders. The total cost of the project was $495,024. By the time the Radiation Laboratory officially closed on December 31, 1945, most manuscripts were complete.

The foreword to the first volume, written by Rad Lab director Lee A. DuBridge, characterized the series as "a memorial to the unnamed hundreds and thousands of other scientists, engineers, and others who actually carried on the research, development, and engineering work the results of which are herein described."

== Publication ==
The planned series was announced in Nature in May 1946, describing the project as comprising twenty-nine titles plus a general index, intended to "treat the advances arising from radar work as the basis for the new electronics, rather than in terms of its contributions to radar."

Publication began in 1947 with Radar System Engineering and concluded on March 22, 1951, with the twenty-seventh and final technical volume, Propagation of Short Radio Waves. The complete series totaled more than 16,000 pages. McGraw-Hill reported sales exceeding 150,000 copies by the completion date and paid over $80,000 in royalties to the U.S. Treasury. The publisher estimated that the commercial arrangement produced a net saving of approximately $260,000 to the federal government compared to the cost of issuing the material as official technical reports. The volumes were subject to Army and Navy security clearance before publication. The Office of Scientific Research and Development purchased approximately 400 copies of each volume: 250 for recipients of the Rad Lab's Summary Technical Reports and 125 for deposit with the Library of Congress for international exchange.

Because the Series was produced entirely with federal funds, its publication contract included provisions intended to ensure broad public access. Royalties were returned to the United States Treasury rather than paid to authors. By January 1953, these payments totaled $132,367, and Ridenour noted that there appeared "a possibility that the entire direct costs of preparing the manuscripts and illustrations of the Series will eventually be returned to the government." The contract also limited McGraw-Hill's copyright on each volume to ten years from the date of publication, after which the content entered the public domain. Ridenour described this clause as serving the public interest. This arrangement followed a broader OSRD publication policy under which copyrights on technical monographs "were not to be granted for a period in excess of that reasonably necessary to insure the initial edition."

Ridenour, who by 1951 was serving as dean of the University of Illinois graduate school, described the completed series as a "compendium of basic information on microwave radar and modern electronics."

== Reception ==
A contemporary review by John R. Pierce of Bell Telephone Laboratories, published in Physics Today in June 1948, assessed four of the early volumes. Pierce characterized the books as "mines of information both theoretical and empirical, of a standard and completeness rarely encountered in books on similar subjects," though he noted that the organization "necessarily suffers somewhat from their being written by many authors with a deadline (not met) and as an assigned task." Pierce observed that despite the volumes' comprehensiveness, "they still cannot be complete, and that new as they are, they cannot be entirely up-to-date."

Rabi, more enthusiastically, described the series as "the biggest thing since the Septuagint."

== Influence ==
=== Microwave technology ===
The series served as what Robert Buderi termed "the occupational bible for at least a generation of physicists and engineers studying microwave electronics." Writing fifty years after their publication, historian Louis Brown observed that volumes "would be found on the bookshelves of almost every electronics engineer and experimental physicist for more than a generation, indeed some are found there today and not just as mementos."

Pierce's review praised the volume on klystrons and microwave triodes for including "valuable material, both experimental and theoretical, which is unavailable elsewhere," including treatments of close-spaced amplifiers and noise sidebands in reflex oscillators. The volume on microwave duplexers was noted as "surprisingly rich in material of general interest on waveguides and resonators."

Buderi credits the series with preventing the concentration of wartime microwave knowledge within a single corporate laboratory and democratizing access to radar technology for academic, industrial, and government researchers. The techniques documented in the series found applications in postwar microwave spectroscopy and radio astronomy as well as continued radar development.

=== Control systems engineering ===
The volume Theory of Servomechanisms (1947) by Hubert M. James, Nathaniel B. Nichols, and Ralph S. Phillips became particularly influential in establishing control systems engineering as a coherent discipline. Historian Chris Bissell called it "perhaps the most influential of all the American publications of the 1940s" in the field. David Mindell's analysis noted that the volume "became a canonical postwar text of control engineering, introducing a generation of engineers to newly constituted discipline" alongside similar volumes from Bell Labs and MIT's Servomechanisms Laboratory.

The volume reflected the Radiation Laboratory's comprehensive approach to systems engineering. As Ivan Getting observed in his introduction, "It is nearly as hard for practitioners in the servo art to agree on the definition of a servo as it is for a group of theologians to agree on sin." The book grounded its theoretical framework in radar-specific applications including the SCR-584 tracking system, automatic and manual tracking schemes, and methods for filtering noisy radar signals.

=== Semiconductor physics ===
The wartime radar program required extensive research into semiconductor crystal rectifiers for microwave detection. Henry Cutler Torrey coordinated this work from the Rad Lab, which was conducted at multiple institutions including Purdue University, where Karl Lark-Horovitz's lab focused on germanium, and the University of Pennsylvania, where Frederick Seitz led silicon research. Silicon became the preferred material for radar service because of its superior temperature stability. The Purdue group's research extended beyond immediate wartime needs, developing germanium diodes capable of withstanding high reverse voltages and establishing fundamental understanding that contributed to later semiconductor development.

The volume Crystal Rectifiers (1948) by Torrey and Charles Whitmer documented wartime advances in solid-state detector technology. The intensive wartime study of silicon and germanium rendered scientists and engineers familiar with melting, etching, and doping techniques that formed the basis for postwar semiconductor manufacturing, contributing to the development of the transistor at Bell Laboratories.

== List of volumes ==
The series comprised twenty-seven technical volumes plus an index:

- Volume 1 – Radar System Engineering; Louis N. Ridenour (1947)
- Volume 2 – Radar Aids to Navigation; John A. Hall (1947)
- Volume 3 – Radar Beacons; Arthur Roberts (1947)
- Volume 4 – Loran; John A. Pierce, Alexander A. McKenzie, Richard H. Woodward (1948)
- Volume 5 – Pulse Generators; G. Norris Glasoe, Jean V. Lebacqz (1948)
- Volume 6 – Microwave Magnetrons; George B. Collins (1948)
- Volume 7 – Klystrons and Microwave Triodes; Donald R. Hamilton, Julian K. Knipp, J. B. Horner Kuper (1948)
- Volume 8 – Principles of Microwave Circuits; Carol G. Montgomery, Robert H. Dicke, Edward M. Purcell (1948)
- Volume 9 – Microwave Transmission Circuits; George L. Ragan (1948)
- Volume 10 – Waveguide Handbook; Nathan Marcuvitz (1951)
- Volume 11 – Technique of Microwave Measurements; Carol G. Montgomery (1947)
- Volume 12 – Microwave Antenna Theory and Design; Samuel Silver (1949)
- Volume 13 – Propagation of Short Radio Waves; Donald E. Kerr (1951)
- Volume 14 – Microwave Duplexers; Louis Smullin, Carol G. Montgomery (1948)
- Volume 15 – Crystal Rectifiers; Henry C. Torrey, Charles A. Whitmer (1948)
- Volume 16 – Microwave Mixers; Robert Pound (1948)
- Volume 17 – Components Handbook; John F. Blackburn (1949)
- Volume 18 – Vacuum Tube Amplifiers; George Valley, Henry Wallman (1948)
- Volume 19 – Waveforms; Britton Chance, Vernon W. Hughes, Edward F. MacNichol Jr., David Sayre, Frederic C. Williams (1949)
- Volume 20 – Electronic Time Measurements; Britton Chance, Robert I. Hulsizer, Edward F. MacNichol Jr., Frederic C. Williams (1949)
- Volume 21 – Electronic Instruments; Ivan A. Greenwood Jr., J. Vance Holdam Jr., Duncan MacRae Jr. (1948)
- Volume 22 – Cathode Ray Tube Displays; Theodore Soller, Merle A. Starr, George E. Valley Jr. (1948)
- Volume 23 – Microwave Receivers; Stanley N. Van Voorhis (1948)
- Volume 24 – Threshold Signals; James L. Lawson, George E. Uhlenbeck (1950)
- Volume 25 – Theory of Servomechanisms; Hubert M. James, Nathaniel B. Nichols, Ralph S. Phillips (1947)
- Volume 26 – Radar Scanners and Radomes; Willoughby M. Cady, Michael B. Karelitz, Louis A. Turner (1948)
- Volume 27 – Computing Mechanisms and Linkages; Antonín Svoboda (1948)
- Volume 28 – Index; Keith Henney (1953)

== See also ==
- Office of Scientific Research and Development
- History of radar

== Bibliography ==
- Brown, Louis (1999). A Radar History of World War II: Technical and Military Imperatives. Bristol: Institute of Physics Publishing. ISBN 0-7503-0659-9.
- Buderi, Robert (1996). The Invention That Changed the World: How a Small Group of Radar Pioneers Won the Second World War and Launched a Technological Revolution. New York: Simon & Schuster. ISBN 978-0684835297.
- Guerlac, Henry E. (1946). Radar in World War II. The History of Modern Physics: 1800–1950. Vol. 8. Tomash Publishers (American Institute of Physics) (published 1987). OCLC 12946636.
- Leslie, Stuart W. (1993). The Cold War and American Science: The Military-Industrial-Academic Complex at MIT and Stanford. New York: Columbia University Press. ISBN 9780231079587.
- Mindell, David A. (2000). "Automation's Finest Hour: Radar and System Integration in World War II". In Hughes, Agatha C.; Hughes, Thomas P. (eds.). Systems, Experts, and Computers: The Systems Approach in Management and Engineering, World War II and After. Cambridge, MA: MIT Press. pp. 27–56. doi:10.7551/mitpress/9780262082853.003.0002. ISBN 9780262275873.
- Ridenour, Louis N. (1947). Radar System Engineering. MIT Radiation Laboratory Series. Vol. 1. New York: McGraw-Hill.
- Ridenour, Louis N. (1953). "Preparation of the Radiation Laboratory Series". In Henney, Keith (ed.). Volume 28: Index. MIT Radiation Laboratory Series. New York: McGraw-Hill. pp. xxv–xxx.
- Seitz, Frederick; Einspruch, Norman G. (1998). Electronic Genie: The Tangled History of Silicon. Urbana: University of Illinois Press.
- Stewart, Irvin (1948). Organizing Scientific Research for War; Administrative History of the OSRD. Boston: Little, Brown & Co.
