= ADRC =

ADRC may refer to:

- Active disturbance rejection control, a control technique in control engineering
- Aging and Disability Resource Center, a program created by the Older Americans Act of 1965
- Air Documents Research Center, the predecessor of the US Defense Technical Information Center
- Asian Disaster Reduction Center, an organisation based in Japan that works to improve disaster resilience, including during the 1991 eruption of Mount Pinatubo
- Auto Discovery Resource Control, an information system for the Internet of Things (IoT), developed by Xped
- Canada Customs and Revenue Agency (French: Agence des douanes et du revenu du Canada, ADRC)
