= Instrument mechanic =

Technician

Instrument mechanics in engineering are tradesmen who specialize in installing, troubleshooting, and repairing instrumentation, automation and control systems. The term "Instrument Mechanic" came about because it was a combination of light mechanical and specialised instrumentation skills. The term is still is used in certain industries; predominantly in industrial process control.

== History ==
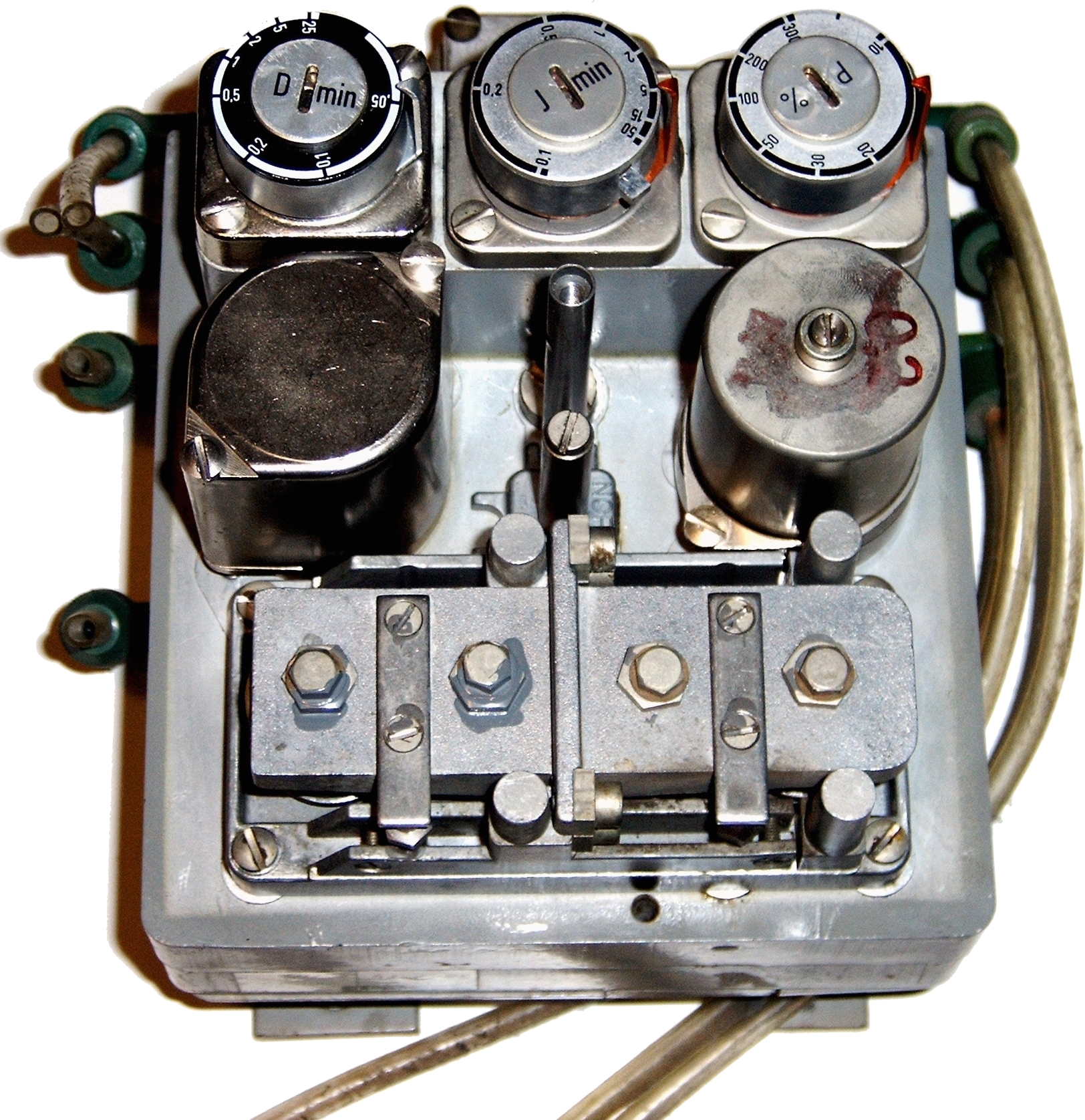
Pneumatic PID (Three term) controller. This type of controller was completely mechanical; hence the expression "instrument mechanic" for someone repair or calibrating it.

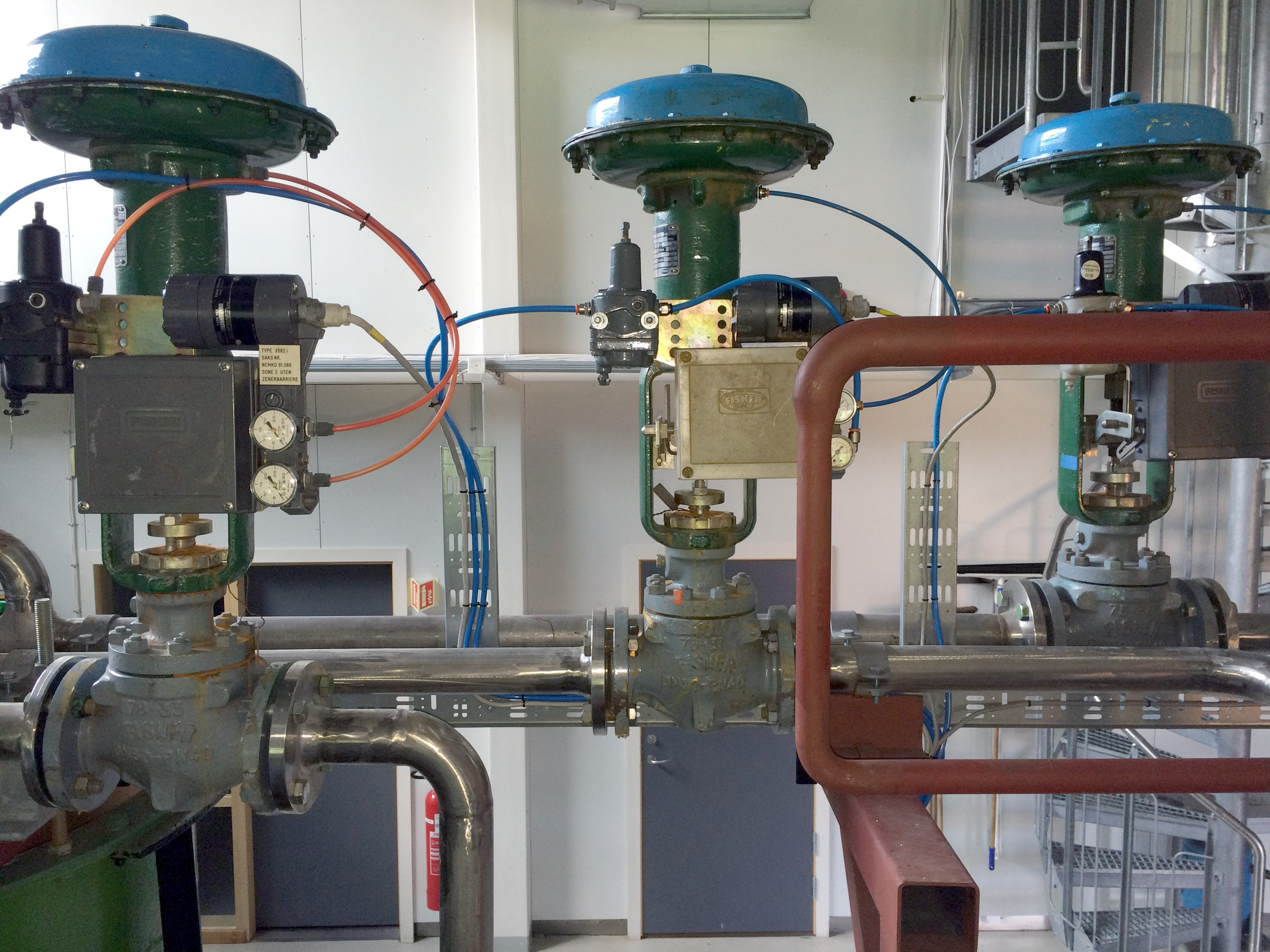
Air-actuated control valves each with a valve positioner to control valve travel. The skills to repair/calibrate require understanding of electronic, control, pneumatic and light mechanical engineering

Instrumentation has existed for hundreds of years in one form or another; the oldest manometer was invented by Evangelista Torricelli in 1643, and the thermometer has been credited to many scientists of about the same period. Over that time, small and large scale industrial plants and manufacturing processes have always needed accurate and reliable process measurements. Originally the demand would only be for measurement instruments, but as process complexity grew, automatic control became more common.

The huge growth in process control instrumentation was boosted by the use of pneumatic controllers, which were used widely after 1930 when Clesson E Mason of the Foxboro Company invented a wide-band pneumatic controller by combining the nozzle and flapper high-gain pneumatic amplifier with negative feedback in a completely mechanical device. The repair and calibration of these devices required both fine mechanical skills and an understanding of the control operation. Likewise the use of control valves with positioners appeared, which required a similar combination of skills.

World War II also brought about a revolution in the use of instrumentation. Further advanced processes requires tighter control than people could provide, and advanced instruments were required to provide measurements in modern processes. Also, the war left industry with a substantially reduced workforce. Industrial instrumentation solved both problems, leading to a rise in its use. Pipe fitters had to learn more about instrumentation and control theory, and a new trade was born.

Today, instrument mechanics combine the skills of repair and calibration with the theoretical understand of how the instrumentation and control works, which is a specialised combination of electronic and mechanical disciplines. Now, almost all new instrumentation is electronic, using either 4-20mA control signals or digital signalling standards, the term instrument mechanic is still used colloquially in some cases.

== Terminology ==
In Canada, journeyman tradesmen who work with instrumentation are called "Instrument Mechanics". In the United States, Australia and elsewhere, they can be called "Instrument fitters". The term may have originated from earlier instrument-qualified people being originally mechanically trained Machinists (also known as a fitter and turner) rather than electricians or "pure" instrument fitters (No secondary trade) as is now the norm.

In the United Kingdom a particular trend has been to call them Electrical/instrument (E/I) craftsmen, with progression to technician level.

== Training and regulation of trade ==
In most countries, the job of an instrument mechanic is a regulated trade for safety reasons due to the many hazards of working with electricity, as well as the dangers posed by incorrectly installed or calibrated instrumentation. The training requires testing, registration, or licensing. Licensing of instrument mechanics is usually controlled through government or educational bodies, and/or professional societies.

The apprenticeship period has been reduced in some cases for Instrumentation Engineering Technologists, who can get their apprenticeship in 2 years rather than 4, depending on the college. In the United Kingdom, the "modern apprenticeship" is 42 months, and requires theory training to National Vocational Qualification (NVQ) level 3.

=== Canada ===
In Canada, the trade of Instrumentation and Control technician is included in the Red Seal inter-provincial journeyman program.

The trade itself is called different things in different provinces. The two most popular names are "Industrial Instrument Mechanic" and "Instrumentation and Control Technician", though Alberta and the Northwest Territories call the certification "Instrument Technician", and Saskatchewan and Nunavut call their certification "Industrial Instrument Technician".

The 1995 Agreement on Internal Trade, agreed upon by all provinces except Nunavut, states that each party to the agreement will provide automatic recognition and free access to all workers holding an inter-provincial standards (Red Seal) program qualification.

Although there is a federal agreement, each province implements the program with its own legislation: (Note that these are all Provincial Acts)

- Prince Edward Island's Journeyman program is regulated by the Apprenticeship and Trades Qualification Act
- Nova Scotia's Journeyman program is regulated by the Apprenticeship and Trades Qualification Act
- Newfoundland's Journeyman program is regulated by the Apprenticeship and Certification Act
- New Brunswick's Journeyman program is regulated by the Apprenticeship and Occupational Certification Act
- Quebec's Journeyman program is regulated by the Manpower Vocational Training and Qualification Act
- Ontario 's Journeyman program is regulated by the Ontario College of Trades act.
- Manitoba's Journeyman program is regulated by the Apprenticeship and Certification act.
- Saskatchewan's Journeyman program is regulated by the Apprenticeship and Trade Certification Act
- Alberta's Journeyman program is regulated by the Apprenticeship and Industry Training Act
- British Columbia's Journeyman program is regulated by the Industry Training and Apprenticeship Act
- Nunavut's Journeyman program is regulated by the Trade and Occupations Certification Act
- The Yukon Territories' Journeyman program is regulated by the Apprenticeship Training Act
- The Northwest Territories' Journeyman program is regulated by the Apprenticeship, Trade, and Occupation Certification Act

Recipients receive a "Certificate of Qualification".

Different provincial jurisdictions may have different regulations.

In Ontario, the Instrumentation and Control apprenticeship program does not contain any restricted skill sets as per Ontario Regulation 565/99, Restricted skill sets. This means that a worker does not need a certificate of apprenticeship or a certificate of qualification to practice the trade.

Training of instrument mechanics follows an apprenticeship model, taking four or five years to progress to fully qualified journeyman level. Typical apprenticeship programs emphasize hands-on work under the supervision of journeymen, but also include a substantial component of classroom training and testing. Training and licensing of instrument mechanics is by province, and some provinces don't have an instrument mechanic licensing program, but provinces recognize qualifications received in others.

Different provincial jurisdictions may have different regulations regarding certification. In Ontario, the On-The-Job training duration for apprentices is 8000 hours, and the in-school training duration is generally 720 hours. One person of journeyman or equivalent status must be working for every apprentice.

Prior to receiving their Journeyman designation, candidates seeking their certificate of qualification must complete a trade exam, testing knowledge of a number of essential skill sets:

- Safe Working Practices and Procedures
- Occupational Skills
- Process Measurement and Indicating Devices
- Process Analyzers, Quality Control Analyzers, and Environmental Emission Analyzers
- Safety Systems and Security Systems
- Energy Development Systems
- Communication Systems and Devices
- Final Control Devices
- Process Control Systems

The trade exam consists of a number of questions in each of these skill sets.

=== Australia ===
Australian instrument fitters are usually re-qualified electricians who complete a 2-year conversion course at an accredited technical college, such as a TAFE, or start as new apprentices with no prior qualifications and complete a 3 year course and a 4 year apprenticeship, in combination with workplace experience of material studied. The first year of the 3 is a basic electrical module, covering AC and DC principals, plus some workshop practicals. The 4th year generally consists of an apprentice choosing a post-trade qualification to study for.

As there is no journeyman accreditation in Australia, at the completion of their trade course, and collection of the required workplace experience, aspirant instrument fitters must pass a "capstone" test, which involves theoretical testing and practical exercises to determine competency. Qualification is recognised with a craft certificate, but not a license in any form.

== Other names ==
Instrument mechanics are sometimes known as:

- Instrument artificers
- Instrument fitters
- Instrumentation Techs (Not to be confused with an Instrumentation Engineering technician)
- Instrument technicians
- E/I craftsmen (United Kingdom)

== Fields of study ==
Instrument mechanics are required to study a large body of knowledge. This includes information on:

- Process Control
- Measurement Instrumentation
- Final Control Elements
- Motors
- Electronics
- Industrial networks
- Signalling standards
- Chemistry
- Fluid Dynamics
