= John Ziegler =

John Ziegler may refer to:

- John Ziegler (guitarist) Pigmy Love Circus, Volto!
- John Bosley Ziegler (died 1983), physician
- John Ziegler (journalist) (born 1967), American conservative journalist
- John G. Ziegler (1909–1997), American control engineer
- John Ziegler Jr. (1934–2018), American lawyer and ice hockey executive

== See also ==
- Ziegler
