= James L. Lawson =

American physicist and radar engineer (1915 to 1982)

- Born: 1915; Madura, India
- Died: May 25, 1982 (aged 66–67); Schenectady, New York
- Education: University of Kansas (BA, MA); University of Michigan (PhD)
- Employer(s): MIT Radiation Laboratory, General Electric
- Known for: Lawson line, Lawson TR box, Yagi antenna design

James Llewellyn "Jim" Lawson (1915–May 25, 1982) was an American physicist and amateur radio enthusiast who made foundational contributions to microwave radar engineering during World War II at the MIT Radiation Laboratory. Holding a PhD from the University of Michigan, Lawson was one of the few early Laboratory members with a strong background in amateur radio, which proved decisive in addressing the practical engineering problems of microwave radar.

His work on transmission-line design and transmit–receive (TR) switching helped make single-antenna microwave radar practical in the Laboratory's first months. He led the Laboratory's Experimental Systems Group (Group 44) for the duration of the war. Luis Alvarez later said of him: "If we had been paid in proportion to our contributions to the success of the first microwave radar program, Jim Lawson would have earned more than half the monthly payroll."

After the war Lawson spent thirty-six years at General Electric in Schenectady, New York, working on particle accelerators, nuclear instrumentation, military communications, and research planning. Under the call sign W2PV, he became one of the most successful amateur radio contesters of his era, winning a world championship in the 1981 CQ World Wide DX Contest shortly before his death.

== Early life and education ==
Lawson was born in Madura, India, and came to the United States at the age of thirteen, growing up in Lawrence, Kansas. He earned bachelor's and master's degrees from the University of Kansas and a doctorate in physics from the University of Michigan. He was an active amateur radio operator from his student days, holding the call signs W9SSP (Kansas) and W8QUI (Michigan).

== Radiation Laboratory ==
=== Early inventions ===
Lawson joined the MIT Radiation Laboratory in late 1940, in the period when the first 10-cm airborne-intercept (AI) system was being assembled on the roof of MIT Building 6. One of the first problems faced was enabling a single antenna to serve for both transmitting and receiving without the transmitted pulse burning out the receiver crystal. While a full duplexing solution was still being sought, Lawson discovered in January 1941 that a klystron used as a preamplifier could buffer the crystal, allowing the roof system to operate with a single paraboloid on January 10.

In parallel with the klystron buffer, Lawson improved the Laboratory's coaxial transmission line by designing what became known as the Lawson line: a beaded coaxial line using a non-uniform spacing of polystyrene beads according to a definite formula, achieving markedly better frequency sensitivity than earlier half-wave or quarter-wave spacing schemes. In March 1941, he designed a successful spark-gap 'TR box', a gas-filled cavity resonant at the operating frequency, with a small metal gap at its center that shorted during the transmitted pulse and recovered in time to pass the returning echo. Introduced into the lab's B-18 flying laboratory around April 1, the Lawson 'TR box' eliminated the klystron buffer entirely. With an improved signal-to-noise ratio, the B-18 system could pick up ships at 15 miles by mid-April. The B18-A system incorporating the Lawson TR box was demonstrated on April 29, 1941, to Sir Hugh Dowding, Commander of RAF Fighter Command. Lawson's 10-cm TR box design also served as the starting model for subsequent 3-cm TR development by other Laboratory engineers.

In July 1941, Lawson traveled to England as one of five Radiation Laboratory staff members dispatched to compare American and British 10-cm radar systems. At the Telecommunications Research Establishment station at Leeson House in Swanage, the Americans and P. I. Dee's centimeter team conducted side-by-side tests of their competing sets beginning July 15. Overall performance was comparable, but the tests exposed an important asymmetry: the American transmitter, using an improved magnetron from I. I. Rabi's group, put out considerably more power, while the British receiver detected much fainter signals. Lawson and Norman Ramsey joined Taffy Bowen and Dale Corson in diagnosing the discrepancy. When they cabled a borrowed British receiver to the American set, the combined system picked up aircraft at three times the previous range. The cause proved to be the superiority of British silicon crystal detectors over the grounded-grid triode mixer the Americans had adopted after their own crystals had partially burned out during earlier testing. The finding prompted the Radiation Laboratory to adopt crystal mixers and bring back the British soft Sutton Tube TR box, changes that materially improved subsequent American radar systems.

=== Experimental Systems Group ===
In the fall of 1941 Lawson organized the Experimental Systems Group (or Group 44, also called the Advanced Development Group), which he led for the remainder of the Laboratory's existence. The group functioned as a research service unit for the Laboratory's development divisions, maintaining carefully calibrated reference radar systems, contributing to component testing, undertaking anti-jamming studies, and attempting to anticipate advances in radar.

=== Project Sambo ===
In June 1942, while Lawson and L. B. Linford were photographing successive pulse reflections from moving targets, they observed traces they attributed to propeller modulation of radar echoes from aircraft. This observation led to the belief that propellers treated with a non-reflecting material might produce modulation signatures usable for identifying friendly aircraft. The Laboratory formally accepted the resulting project, codenamed Sambo, in April 1943.

== Later career ==
Lawson joined General Electric in Schenectady shortly after the war ended in 1945 and was named head of the company's nuclear-investigation division. He helped design and construct a non-ferromagnetic synchrotron, a new type of particle accelerator that was used to study the effects of high-energy radiation; GE announced its successful operation in April 1950. Lawson also planned and supervised the construction of a gamma-ray spectroscope for analyzing X-ray particles. He later directed work in advanced military communications systems, solid-state physics, integrated circuitry, and computer science. From 1974 to 1976 he served as manager of research and development planning for General Electric, then continued as a consultant until his retirement in 1981.

After retiring from General Electric, Lawson turned to phase-noise research in receivers, commissioning approximately $50,000 in precision test equipment from Hewlett-Packard; his experimental work led to several HP application notes on phase-noise measurements, though he died before completing the research.

== Amateur radio ==
Lawson was an accomplished amateur radio contester. His call signs tracked his geographic moves: W9SSP (Kansas), W8QUI (Michigan), WA2SFP (early Schenectady period), and finally W2PV in 1968, under which he achieved his greatest contest success. He also operated as AC2PV during the 1976 Bicentennial Celebration. His station in Niskayuna, on a three-acre property in suburban Schenectady County, featured towers up to 180 feet (55 m) with stacked Yagi arrays on multiple bands. As a single operator, Lawson won first place in the United States in the Singe Op, All Band category in the CQ WW Phone contest in 1965, 1966, 1968, and 1971. After switching to multi-operator, multi-transmitter (multi-multi) operations beginning in 1973, W2PV won first place multi-multi in ARRL DX Phone in 1976, 1977, 1978, 1979, and 1981, and first place multi-multi in both modes of CQ WW in 1977.

In his final contest in November 1981, while gravely ill, Lawson and his team won first place worldwide in the multi-multi category of the CQ WW CW contest, believed to be the first time a station in the United States worked 100 countries and 30 zones on four bands in the event. The competing multi-multi stations conceded the results early so that CQ magazine could produce the winner's plaque in time for Lawson to receive it before his death; the results appeared in the October 1982 issue.

Lawson helped design the OH2AM contest station in Finland in the 1960s. His posthumous book Yagi Antenna Design (1986), based on a series of articles in Ham Radio Magazine from 1979 to 1980, remains a standard reference on computer-optimized Yagi antenna design.

He was posthumously inducted into the CQ Contest Hall of Fame in April 1993. The W2PV call sign is now held by the Yankee Clipper Contest Club.

== Personal life ==
In addition to his amateur radio accomplishments, Lawson was also a mountain climber, scaling the Matterhorn and Mount Kilimanjaro among other peaks.

Lawson's first wife was Jane, who helped host contest operating crews at their home. After Jane's death, he married Amalia ("Molly," née Sokal), who had worked in his General Electric department. He died on May 25, 1982, at his home in Schenectady. The Dr. James L. Lawson Memorial Scholarship, administered by the ARRL Foundation, provides an annual award to amateur radio operators pursuing studies in electronics, communications, or related fields.

He died on May 25, 1982, at his home in Schenectady. He was survived by his wife Molly, four children, and four grandchildren.

== Selected publications ==
=== Journal articles ===
- Lawson, J. L. (1939). "The Beta- and Gamma-Radiations from Cu^{64} and Eu^{152}". Physical Review. 56 (2): 125–130. doi:10.1103/PhysRev.56.125.
- Lawson, J. L.; Cork, J. M. (1939). "Induced Radioactivity in Cadmium and Indium". Physical Review. 56 (4): 291–296. doi:10.1103/PhysRev.56.291.
- Lawson, J. L.; Cork, J. M. (1940). "The Radioactive Isotopes of Indium". Physical Review. 57 (11): 982–994. doi:10.1103/PhysRev.57.982.
- Lawson, J. L. (1949). "88-Mev Gamma-Ray Cross Sections". Physical Review. 75 (3): 433–435. doi:10.1103/PhysRev.75.433.

=== Books ===
- Lawson, J. L.; Uhlenbeck, G. E. (1950). Threshold Signals. MIT Radiation Laboratory Series. Vol. 24. New York: McGraw-Hill. p. 388.
- Lawson, J. L. (1986). Yagi Antenna Design. Newington, CT: ARRL. ISBN 0-87259-041-0.
