= George E. Valley Jr. =

American nuclear physicist

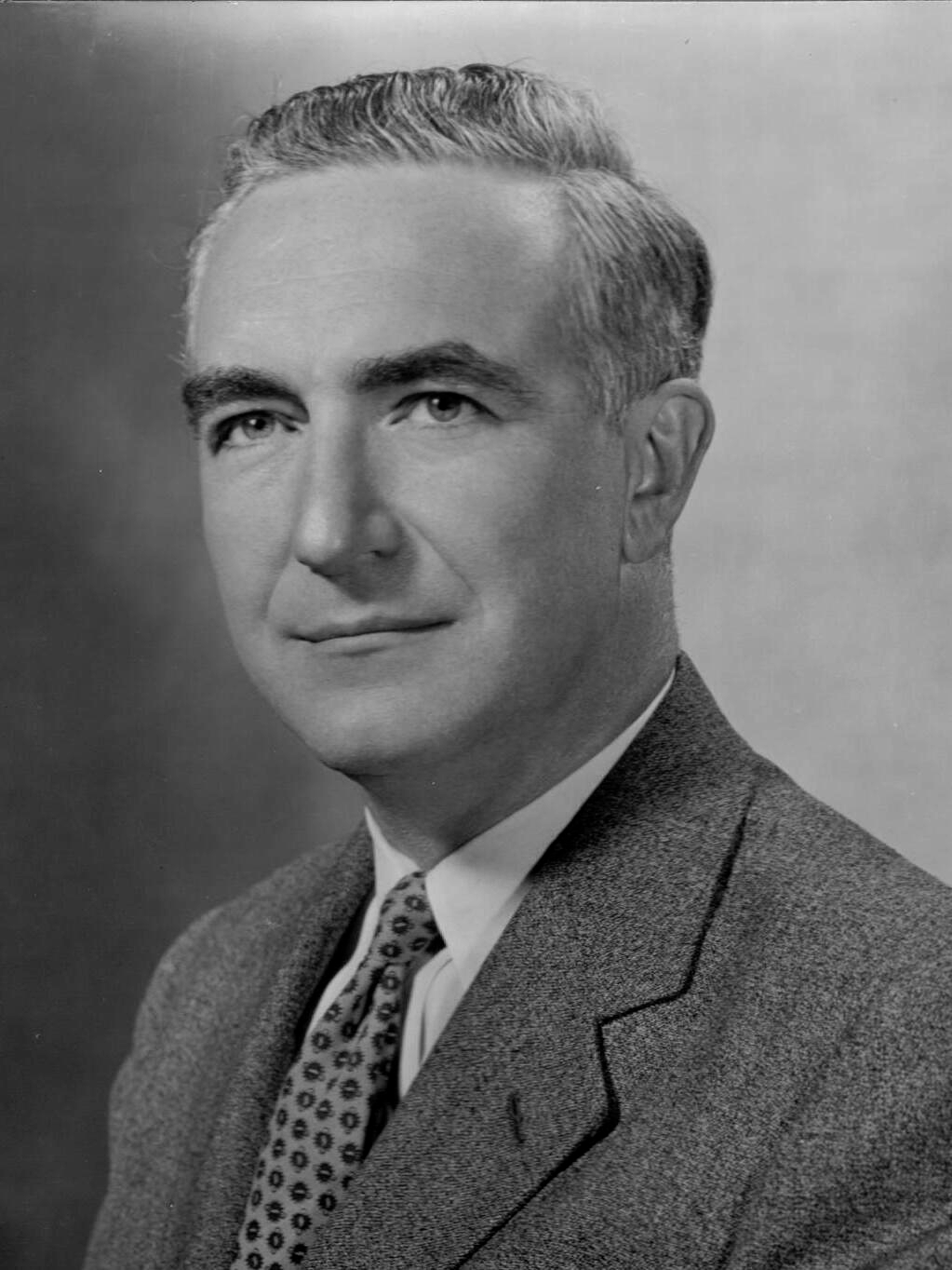
George E. Valley Jr.

George Edward Valley Jr. (September 5, 1913 – October 16, 1999) was an American physicist who joined the MIT Radiation Laboratory in 1940, where he led the development of the H2X radar bombsight. After the war he became a professor of physics at MIT. He helped found the MIT Lincoln Laboratory, invented the SAGE air defense system, and started the MIT Experimental Studies Group.

Valley went to Flushing NY public schools and then to the Massachusetts Institute of Technology where he graduated with an SB in physics in 1935. His Bachelor's thesis was "Development of White Standards for Use in Colorimetry" with Prof. Arthur C. Hardy. After working for Bausch and Lomb Optical Co. for a short period of time, he enrolled as a graduate student in physics at the University of Rochester where he obtained his PhD under Prof. Lee A. DuBridge in 1939; his thesis, titled “The Determination of the Energies of the Radiations from Artificial Radioactive Elements”, involved development and applications of the new Rochester cyclotron.

Valley moved to Harvard in 1939 as a Research Assistant and National Research Council Fellow in Prof. Kenneth Bainbridge's group. He built a thermal ionization, magnetic sector, mass spectrometer to compare the iron isotope ratios of Earth with other bodies in the Solar System. Unlike the instruments of today, this involved a room full of Pb-acid batteries to generate a stable 800-V potential and breaking/re-blowing the glass sample chamber for each sample change. Much to Bainbridge's annoyance, no differences could be detected. This research was interrupted by events in Europe and not published until after World War II. The field of Fe-isotope geochemistry, pioneered by Valley, lay dormant over 50 years, but has now blossomed with development of newer more-sensitive mass spectrometers.

Valley was recruited to join the MIT Radiation Laboratory in Cambridge MA by DuBridge in 1941. At the Rad Lab, Valley led development of the Dual Lobe Gun-laying System (1941–42) and then developed the first 3-cm radar bombsight (AN/APS-15, H_{2}X, “Mickey”), which was used by USAF Nov. 1943–1945. After the war, he remained at the Rad Lab for one year to edit four books in the MIT Radiation Laboratory Series. These books summarized the unclassified knowledge developed at the Rad Lab in a wide range of fields. Vacuum Tube Amplifiers edited by Valley and Wallman (1948) became the best seller of the series and was used as a textbook well into the 1960s despite the prevalence of transistor technology.

In 1947, Valley returned to MIT as assistant professor of physics where his research was concentrated in nuclear physics, cosmic rays and high energy particles. He built and operated a high-pressure cloud chamber at Summit Lake (elev. 13,200 ft.) on Mt. Evans, Colorado in collaboration with Prof. Bruno B. Rossi. This research, also, was cut short by world affairs.

The world changed dramatically August 29, 1949 when the Soviet Union exploded its first atomic bomb. The threat of Soviet bombers coming across the north pole into the United States ended US complacency following World War II. Valley, a member of the US Air Force Scientific Advisory Board since 1946, wrote a letter on Nov. 8, 1949 to Theodor von Karman and General Hoyt Vandenberg, Air Force Chief of Staff, proposing formation of ADSEC to study US air defenses. This led to Project Charles, directed by Valley, and to the establishment of the MIT Lincoln Laboratory. Valley is widely credited with developing the Semi-Automatic Ground Environment (SAGE) air defense system at Lincoln Lab that required installation of remote radar stations (Distant Early Warning, DEW Line) and development of magnetic-core memory and the digital computer.

After leaving Lincoln Lab, Valley served as Chief Scientist of the U.S. Air Force (1957–1958). Although not likely one of his main assignments, the most cited output of this period is his brief report on UFOs, “Some Considerations Affecting the Interpretation of Reports of Unidentified Flying Objects” reprinted in an appendix to the Condon Report.

Back at MIT, Valley performed a number of administrative functions. Perhaps the most interesting was his study of the freshman year motivated by concerns that MIT at that time was flunking out an unacceptably high percentage of its freshman, who were chosen from some of the best applicants in the country. Valley spent one full year participating in every activity that an MIT freshman participated in and summarized his experience with a report to the MIT Board. This work led directly to the creation of the MIT Experimental Study Group (ESG), an alternative learning option offered to all incoming freshmen that is still going strong 50 years later. Valley retired from MIT in 1974.

Andrew Goldstein interviewed Valley on June 13, 1991, and recorded an oral history.

In recognition of Valley's contributions to physics, the American Physical Society created the George E. Valley Jr. Prize, which awards $10,000 annually to "early-career individual for an outstanding scientific contribution to physics that is deemed to have significant potential for a dramatic impact on the field."
