= Carol G. Montgomery =

American physicist (1909–1950)

Carol Gray Montgomery (1909–1950) was an American physicist. Born in Denver, he earned a bachelor's degree from Caltech and a doctorate from Yale University. At Yale, he helped build an early linear electron accelerator, after which he moved to MIT in 1942, where he undertook war work at the Radiation Laboratory. He wrote or co-authored three volumes of Radiation Laboratory technical publications. He was elected a Fellow of the American Physical Society in 1938, having been nominated by the Bartol Research Foundation where he and his collaborators conducted experimental work with coincidence counters.

== Selected publications ==
- Montgomery, C. G.; Dicke, R. H.; Purcell, E. M. (1948). Principles of Microwave Circuits. MIT Radiation Laboratory Series. Vol. 8. New York: McGraw-Hill.
- Montgomery, C. G. (1947). Technique of Microwave Measurements. MIT Radiation Laboratory Series. Vol. 11. New York: McGraw-Hill.
- Smullin, L. D.; Montgomery, C. G. (1948). Microwave Duplexers. MIT Radiation Laboratory Series. Vol. 14. New York: McGraw-Hill.
