= James M. Cork =

American physicist

James Murle Cork (July 9, 1894, Yale, Michigan – November 27, 1957, Ann Arbor, Michigan) was an American physicist, known for his research in nuclear physics and nuclear spectroscopy.

== Biography ==
He graduated in 1911 from Yale High School in Yale, Michigan. At the University of Michigan, he graduated in 1916 with a B.S., in 1917 with an M.S., and in 1922 with a Ph.D. From 1917 to 1918 he was a first lieutenant in the U.S. Army Signal Corps. He was from 1917 to 1919 an assistant physicist at the Bureau of Standards in Washington, D.C. and from 1919 to 1920 an assistant professor at Pennsylvania State College. In the department of physics of the University of Michigan he was from 1920 to 1922 an instructor, from 1922 to 1937 an associate professor, and from 1937 until his death in 1957 a full professor.

After the attack on Pearl Harbor, Cork was from 1942 to 1946 a section member and research supervisor of the National Defense Research Committee (NDRC). He gained an international reputation for his research in nuclear physics and radioactivity. He was a consultant for Argonne National Laboratory and the Atomic Energy Commission (AEC). He was one of the assistant editors for the American Institute of Physics Handbook.

Cork was elected in 1928 a fellow of the American Physical Society and in 1940 a fellow of the American Association for the Advancement of Science.

He married Laurie Mae Kaufmann in 1918. They had two children.

== Selected publications ==
=== Articles ===
- Cork, James M. (1919). "Airplane Antenna Constants". Scientific Papers of the Bureau of Standards. U.S. Government Printing Office: 199–213.
- —— (1923). "Characteristic L absorption of x-rays for elements of atomic numbers 62 to 77". Physical Review. 21 (3): 326–333. doi:10.1103/PhysRev.21.326. hdl:2027/mdp.39015076333312.
- ——; James, C.; Fogg, H. C. (1926). "The Concentration and Identification of the Element of Atomic Number 61". Proceedings of the National Academy of Sciences. 12 (12): 696–699. Bibcode:1926PNAS...12..696C. doi:10.1073/pnas.12.12.696. PMC 1084783. PMID 16587137.
- —— (1927). "LX.The crystal structure of some of the alums". The London, Edinburgh, and Dublin Philosophical Magazine and Journal of Science. 4 (23): 688–698. doi:10.1080/14786441008564371.
- Fox, Gerald W.; —— (1931). "The Regular Reflection of X-rays from Quartz Crystals Oscillating Piezoelectrically". Physical Review. 38 (8): 1420–1423. Bibcode:1931PhRv...38.1420F. doi:10.1103/PhysRev.38.1420.
- Witmer, R. B.; —— (1932). "The Measurement of X-Ray Emission Wave-Lengths by Means of the Ruled Grating". Physical Review. 42 (6): 743–748. Bibcode:1932PhRv...42..743W. doi:10.1103/PhysRev.42.743.
- —— (1932). "Laue Patterns from Thick Crystals at Rest and Oscillating Piezoelectrically". Physical Review. 42 (6): 749–752. Bibcode:1932PhRv...42..749C. doi:10.1103/PhysRev.42.749.
- ——; Lawrence, E. O. (1936). "The Transmutation of Platinum by Deuterons". Physical Review. 49 (11): 788–792. Bibcode:1936PhRv...49..788C. doi:10.1103/PhysRev.49.788.
- Lawson, J. L.; —— (1937). "The Radioactive Isotopes of Indium". Physical Review. 52 (6): 531–535. Bibcode:1937PhRv...52..531L. doi:10.1103/PhysRev.52.531.
- Kraus, J.; —— (1937). "Radioactive Isotopes of Palladium and Silver from Palladium". Physical Review. 52 (8): 763–768. Bibcode:1937PhRv...52..763K. doi:10.1103/PhysRev.52.763.
- Stewart, D.; Lawson, J.; —— (1937). "Induced Radioactivity in Strontium and Yttrium". Physical Review. 52 (9): 901–906. Bibcode:1937PhRv...52..901S. doi:10.1103/PhysRev.52.901.
- ——; Lawson, J. L. (1939). "Induced Radioactivity in Cadmium and Indium". Physical Review. 56 (4): 291–294. Bibcode:1939PhRv...56..291C. doi:10.1103/PhysRev.56.291.
- Lawson, J. L.; —— (1940). "The Radioactive Isotopes of Indium". Physical Review. 57 (11): 982–994. Bibcode:1940PhRv...57..982L. doi:10.1103/PhysRev.57.982.
- ——; Smith, Gail P. (1941). "Radioactive Isotopes of Barium from Cesium". Physical Review. 60 (7): 480–482. Bibcode:1941PhRv...60..480C. doi:10.1103/PhysRev.60.480.
- ——; Pidd, R. W. (1944). "The Absorption of Gamma-Radiation in Copper and Lead". Physical Review. 66 (9–10): 227–230. Bibcode:1944PhRv...66..227C. doi:10.1103/PhysRev.66.227.
- —— (1947). "Gamma-Radiation from Tantalum, Iridium, and Gold". Physical Review. 72 (7): 581–585. Bibcode:1947PhRv...72..581C. doi:10.1103/PhysRev.72.581.
- ——; Shreffler, R. G.; Fowler, C. M. (1948). "Neutron Induced Radioactivity in Certain Rare-Earth Elements". Physical Review. 74 (3): 240–243. Bibcode:1948PhRv...74..240C. doi:10.1103/PhysRev.74.240.
- ——; Shreffler, R. G.; Fowler, C. M. (1948). "Converted Gamma-Radiation from Silver, Cadmium, Indium, Praseodynium, and Rhenium". Physical Review. 74 (11): 1657–1659. Bibcode:1948PhRv...74.1657C. doi:10.1103/PhysRev.74.1657.
- ——; Rutledge, W. C.; Stoddard, A. E.; Branyan, C. E.; Leblanc, J. M. (1950). "Radioactivity from Enriched Isotopes of Cadmium". Physical Review. 79 (6): 938–939. Bibcode:1950PhRv...79..938C. doi:10.1103/PhysRev.79.938.

=== Books ===
- Wood, William Platt; Cork, James M. (1927). Pyrometry (1st ed.). McGraw-Hill.
- Cork, James M. (1937). Heat (1st ed.). J. Wiley & Sons.
- Cork, James M. (1946). Radioactivity and nuclear physics (1st ed.). Van Nostrand. 2nd edition, 1950 revised 3rd edition, 1957. ISBN 0442016956.
  - Radioactivité et physique nuclêaire. Traduit par J.P. Bodet. Paris: Dunod. 1949.
