= John G. Ziegler =

American engineer (1909–1997)

- Born: August 21, 1909
- Died: December 9, 1997 (aged 88); Scottsdale, Arizona
- Scientific career
- Fields: Control theory

John G. Ziegler (August 21, 1909 – December 9, 1997) was an American control engineer who made significant contributions to the field of control theory. He is well known for his research paper on Ziegler-Nichols method, co-authored with Nathaniel B. Nichols.
