= Nathaniel B. Nichols =

American control engineer (1914–1997)

- Born: 1914; Nottawa Township, Isabella County, Michigan
- Died: April 17, 1997 (aged 82–83)
- Education: University of Michigan; Central Michigan University
- Scientific career
- Fields: Control theory

Nathaniel B. Nichols (1914–1997) was an American control engineer who made significant contributions to the field of control theory. He is well known for his book Theory of Servomechanisms, one of the most widely read books in control engineering.

Nichols received a B.S. in chemistry in 1936 from Central Michigan University, and an M.S. in physics from the University of Michigan in 1937.

He was President of the IEEE Control Systems Society in 1968 and the American Automatic Control Council in 1974 and in 1975; and a recipient of the Rufus Oldenburger Medal (1969) and the Richard E. Bellman Control Heritage Award (1980).
