= Poles of astronomical bodies =

Celestial coordinate system

The poles of astronomical bodies are determined by their axis of rotation in relation to the celestial poles of the celestial sphere. Astronomical bodies include stars, planets, dwarf planets and small Solar System bodies such as comets and minor planets (e.g., asteroids), as well as natural satellites and minor-planet moons.

== Poles of rotation ==
The International Astronomical Union (IAU) defines the north pole of a planet or any of its satellites in the Solar System as the planetary pole that is in the same celestial hemisphere, relative to the invariable plane of the Solar System, as Earth's north pole. This definition is independent of the object's direction of rotation about its axis. This implies that an object's direction of rotation, when viewed from above its north pole, may be either clockwise or counterclockwise. The direction of rotation exhibited by most objects in the solar system (including the Sun and Earth) is counterclockwise. Venus rotates clockwise, and Uranus has been knocked on its side and rotates almost perpendicular to the rest of the Solar System. The ecliptic remains within 3° of the invariable plane over five million years, but is now inclined about 23.44° to Earth's celestial equator used for the coordinates of poles. This large inclination means that the declination of a pole relative to Earth's celestial equator could be negative even though a planet's north pole (such as Uranus's) is north of the invariable plane.

In 2009 the responsible IAU Working Group decided to define the poles of dwarf planets, minor planets, their satellites, and comets according to the right-hand rule. To avoid confusion with the "north" and "south" definitions relative to the invariable plane, the poles are called "positive" and "negative." The positive pole is the pole toward which the thumb points when the fingers of the right hand are curled in its direction of rotation. The negative pole is the pole toward which the thumb points when the fingers of the left hand are curled in its direction of rotation. This change was needed because the poles of some asteroids and comets precess rapidly enough for their north and south poles to swap within a few decades using the invariable plane definition.

The projection of a planet's north pole onto the celestial sphere gives its north celestial pole. The location of the celestial poles of some selected Solar System objects is shown in the following table. The coordinates are given relative to Earth's celestial equator and the vernal equinox as they existed at J2000 (2000 January 1 12:00:00 TT) which is a plane fixed in inertial space now called the International Celestial Reference Frame (ICRF). Many poles precess or otherwise move relative to the ICRF, so their coordinates will change. The Moon's poles are particularly mobile.

Object	North pole			South pole		
Object	RA	Dec.	Constellation	RA	Dec.	Constellation
Sun	286.13	+63.87	Draco	106.13	−63.87	Carina
Mercury	281.01	+61.41	Draco	101.01	−61.41	Pictor
Venus	92.76	−67.16	Dorado	272.76	+67.16	Draco
Earth	—	+90.00	Ursa Minor	—	−90.00	Octans
Moon	266.86	+65.64	Draco	86.86	−65.64	Dorado
Mars	317.68	+52.89	Cygnus	137.68	−52.89	Vela
Jupiter	268.06	+64.50	Draco	88.06	−64.50	Dorado
Saturn	40.59	+83.54	Cepheus	220.59	−83.54	Octans
Uranus	257.31	−15.18	Ophiuchus	77.31	+15.18	Orion
Neptune	299.33	+42.95	Cygnus	119.33	−42.95	Puppis
	Positive pole			Negative pole		
Pluto	132.99	−6.16	Hydra	312.99	+6.16	Delphinus

Some bodies in the Solar System, including Saturn's moon Hyperion and the asteroid 4179 Toutatis, lack a stable north pole. They rotate chaotically because of their irregular shape and gravitational influences from nearby planets and moons, and as a result the instantaneous pole wanders over their surface, and may momentarily vanish altogether (when the object comes to a standstill with respect to the distant stars).

== Magnetic poles ==
Planetary magnetic poles are defined analogously to the Earth's North and South magnetic poles: they are the locations on the planet's surface at which the planet's magnetic field lines are vertical. The direction of the field determines whether the pole is a magnetic north or south pole, exactly as on Earth. The Earth's magnetic axis is approximately aligned with its rotational axis, meaning that the geomagnetic poles are relatively close to the geographic poles.

However, this is not necessarily the case for other planets; for example, the magnetic axis of Uranus, which has an extreme axial tilt, is inclined by as much as 60° to its rotational axis, while Neptune's magnetic field is also strongly tilted relative to its rotational axis at 47°. Harvard University scientists observed that such magnetic fields of Uranus and Neptune may be due to stable planetary cores which obstruct convection.

On Earth, the magnetic north pole is located in the planet's southern hemisphere and the south pole of the dipole lies in its northern hemisphere - and this is similarly also for planets Mercury, Mars and Uranus. However, on planet Jupiter, as also on Saturn and Neptune, the north magnetic pole is located in the northern hemisphere, and the south magnetic pole lies in the southern hemisphere, which is reversed compared to the Earth.

Planet Venus is known not to have a magnetic field of its own and so has no fixed magnetic poles. Instead, Venus has what is known as an induced magnetic field, which is created by the interaction of Venus's own outer atmosphere with the Sun's magnetic field. This induced magnetosphere envelops the planet Venus like an extended teardrop shape, or the tail of a comet, and its magnetic field's Bx component was observed by Venus Express to change directions, more frequently during strong solar eruptions, as the solar wind blows past Venus and outward into the solar system.

== Orbital pole ==
In addition to the rotational pole, a planet's orbit also has a defined direction in space. The direction of the angular momentum vector of that orbit can be defined as an orbital pole. Earth's orbital pole, i.e. the ecliptic pole, points in the direction of the constellation Draco.

== Near, far, leading and trailing poles ==
In the particular (but frequent) case of synchronous satellites, four more poles can be defined. They are the near, far, leading, and trailing poles. For example, Io, one of the moons of Jupiter, rotates synchronously, so its orientation with respect to Jupiter stays constant. There will be a single, unmoving point of its surface where Jupiter is at the zenith, exactly overhead – this is the near pole, also called the sub- or pro-Jovian point. At the antipode of this point is the far pole, where Jupiter lies at the nadir; it is also called the anti-Jovian point. There will also be a single unmoving point which is farthest along Io's orbit (best defined as the point most removed from the plane formed by the north–south and near-far axes, on the leading side) – this is the leading pole. At its antipode lies the trailing pole. Io can thus be divided into north and south hemispheres, into pro- and anti-Jovian hemispheres, and into leading and trailing hemispheres. These poles are mean poles because the points are not, strictly speaking, unmoving: there is continuous libration about the mean orientation, because Io's orbit is slightly eccentric and the gravity of the other moons disturbs it regularly.

== See also ==
- Galactic coordinate system
- Planetary coordinate system
