= Vincentio =

Vincentio is an Italian masculine given name, and may refer to:

- Vincentio Bastini (circa 1529–1591), Italian cornettist and composer
- Vincentio Bellovacensi (Vincent of Beauvais) (c. 1190 – 1264?), French Dominican friar
- Vincentio Reinieri (1606-1647), Italian mathematician and astronomer
- Vincentio Saviolo (died circa 1598), Italian fencing master
- Duke Vincentio, a fictional character in William Shakespeare's play Measure for Measure
