= Magnetic field of Mars =

Past magnetic field of the planet Mars

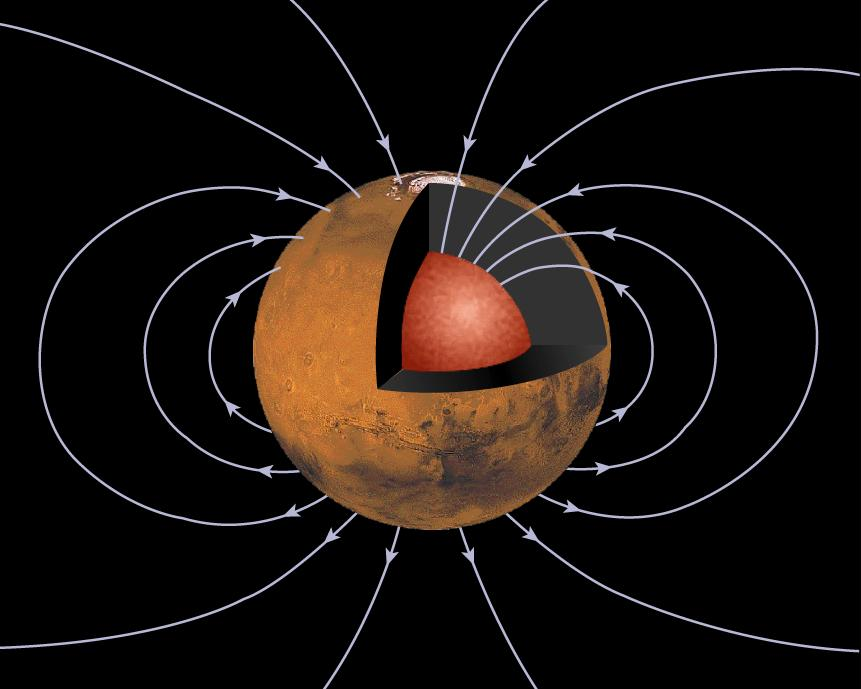
Martian Dynamo. The schematic illustration of the ancient dipolar magnetic field of Mars generated by a core dynamo process.

The magnetic field of Mars is the magnetic field once generated from Mars's interior. Mars no longer has a global magnetic field. However, Mars did power an early dynamo that produced a strong magnetic field 4 billion years ago, comparable to Earth's present surface field. After the early dynamo ceased, a weak late dynamo was reactivated (or persisted up to) ~3.8 billion years ago. The distribution of Martian crustal magnetism is similar to the Martian dichotomy. Whereas the Martian northern lowlands are largely unmagnetized, the southern hemisphere possesses strong remanent magnetization, showing alternating stripes. Scientific understanding of the evolution of the magnetic field of Mars is based on the combination of satellite measurements and Martian ground-based magnetic data.

== Crustal magnetism ==
=== Satellite data ===
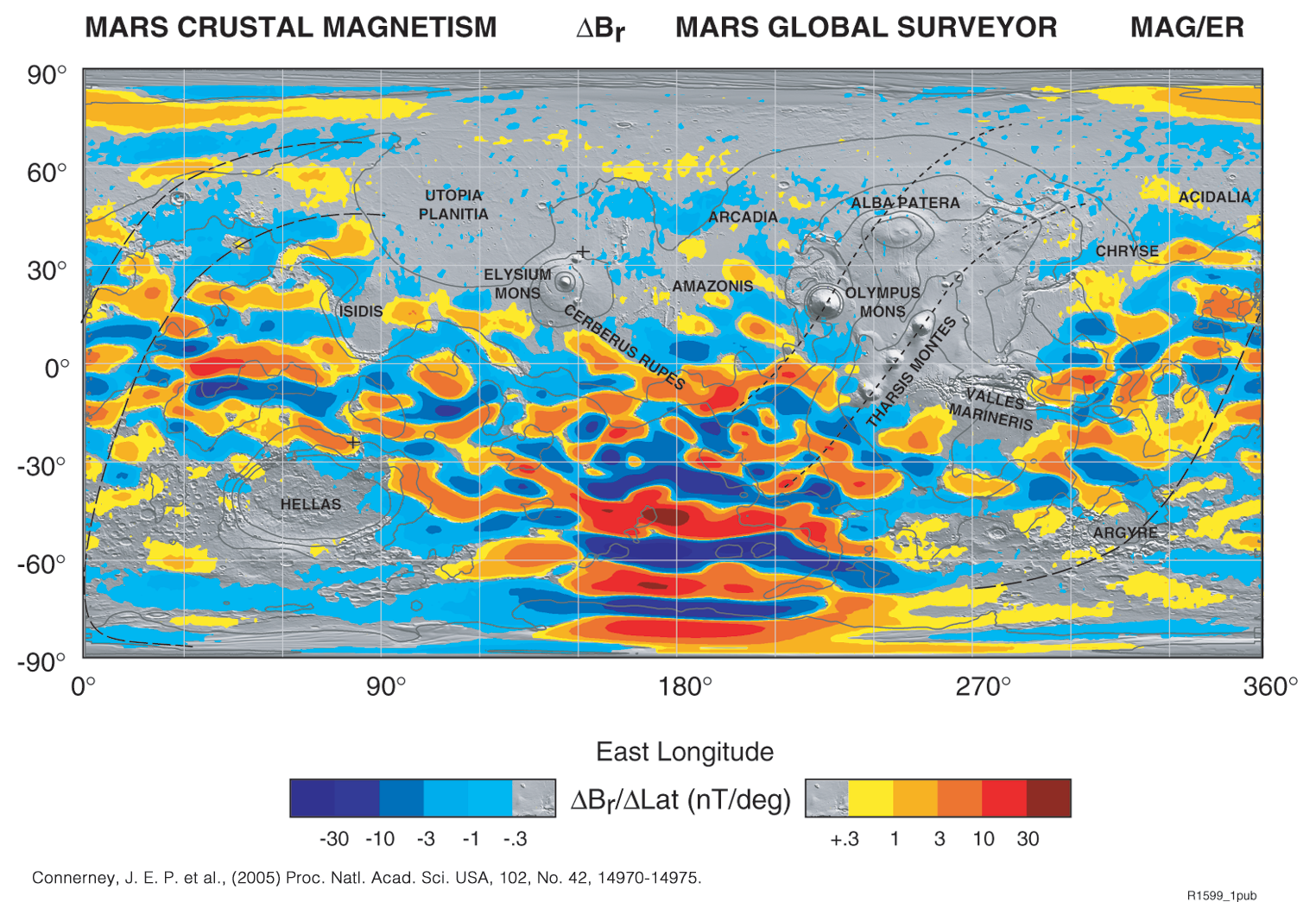
Map of Martian crustal magnetism. Cylindrical projection map of crustal magnetism on Mars observed by MGS satellite at 400 km altitude. Colors represent intensities of the median value of the radial magnetic field components contoured over two orders of magnitude variation.

The reconstruction of the Martian global crustal magnetism is mainly based on magnetic field measurements from the Mars Global Surveyor (MGS) magnetic field experiment/electron reflectometer (MAG/ER) and Mars Atmosphere and Volatile Evolution (MAVEN) magnetic-field data. However, these satellites are located at altitudes of 90–6000 km and have spatial resolutions of ≥160 km, so the measured magnetization cannot observe crustal magnetic fields at smaller scales.

Mars currently does not sustain an active dynamo, based on Mars Global Surveyor (MGS) and Mars Atmosphere and Volatile Evolution (MAVEN) magnetic field measurements. The satellite data show that the older (~4.2–4.3 billion years, Ga) southern-hemisphere crust records strong remanent magnetization (~22 nT), but the younger northern lowlands have a much weaker or zero remanent magnetization. The large basins formed during the Late Heavy Bombardment (LHB) (~ 4.1–3.9 Ga) (e.g., Argyre, Hellas, and Isidis) and volcanic provinces (e.g., Elysium, Olympus Mons, Tharsis Montes, and Alba Patera) lack magnetic signatures, but the younger Noachian and Hesperian volcanoes (e.g., Tyrrhenus Mons and Syrtis Major) have crustal remanence.

=== Mars lander observation ===
The Interior Exploration using Seismic Investigations, Geodesy and Heat Transport (InSight) mission measured the crustal field at the Insight landing site located in Elysium Planitia to be ~2 μT. This detailed ground-level data is an order of magnitude higher than satellite-based estimates of ~200 nT at the InSight landing site. The source of this high magnetization is suggested to be Noachian basement (~3.9 Ga) beneath the Early Amazonian and Hesperian flows (~3.6 and 1.5 Ga).

== Paleomagnetism ==
=== Paleomagnetic evidence ===
Martian meteorites enable estimates of Mars's paleofield based on the thermal remanent magnetization (or TRM) (i.e., the remanent magnetization acquired when the meteorite cooled below the Curie temperature in the presence of the ambient magnetic field). The thermal remanent magnetization of carbonates in meteorite ALH84001 revealed that the early (4.1–3.9 Ga) Martian magnetic field was ~50 μT, much higher than the modern field, suggesting that a Martian dynamo was present until at least this time. The younger (~1.4 Ga) Martian Nakhlite meteorite Miller Range (MIL) 03346 recorded a paleofield of only ~5 μT. However, given the possible source locations of the Nakhlite meteorite, its paleointensity still suggests that the surface magnetization is stronger than the magnetic fields estimated from satellite measurements. The ~5 μT paleofield of this meteorite can be explained either by a late active dynamo or the field generated from lava flows emplaced in the absence of a late Martian dynamo.

=== Martian meteorites as paleomagnetic recorders ===
Martian meteorites contain a wide range of magnetic minerals that can record ancient remanent magnetism, including magnetite, titano-magnetite, pyrrhotite, and hematite. The magnetic mineralogy includes single domain (SD), pseudo single domain (PSD)-like, and multi-domain (MD) states. However, only a limited number of Martian meteorites are available to reconstruct the Martian paleofield due to aqueous, thermal, and shock overprints that make many Martian meteorites unsuitable for these studies. Paleomagnetic studies of Martian meteorites are listed in the table below:

Type	Crystallization Age	Shock events	Paleointensity	Sources	References
Shergottites (Shergotty)	~343 Ma	multiple shock events	2 μT, 0.25–1 μT	shock demagnetization	
Shergottites (Tissint)	~600 Ma	multiple shock events	2 μT	remagnetized by impact events	
Nakhlite	~1.3–1.4 Ga	-	4 μT	late dynamo ?	
Nakhlite	~1.4 Ga	no significant shock event	5 μT	old source rock or late dynamo ?	
ALH84001	~4.5 Ga	~4.0 Ga (major impact)	50 μT	active early dynamo	
ALH84001	~4.5 Ga	~4.0 Ga (major impact)			

== Martian dynamo ==
=== Timeline of Martian dynamo ===
The exact timing and duration of the Martian dynamo remain unknown, but there are several constraints from satellite observations and paleomagnetic studies. The strong crustal magnetization in the southern hemisphere and the paleomagnetic evidence of ALH84001 indicate that Mars sustained a strong magnetic field between ~4.2–4.3 Ga. The absence of crustal magnetic signatures in the upper lowlands and large impact basins implies dynamo termination prior to the formation of these basins (~4.0–3.9 Ga). Magnetic anomalies from two young volcanoes (e.g., Tyrrhenus Mons, Syrtis Major) may reflect the presence of a Martian magnetic field with possible magnetic reversals during the late Noachian and Hesperian periods.

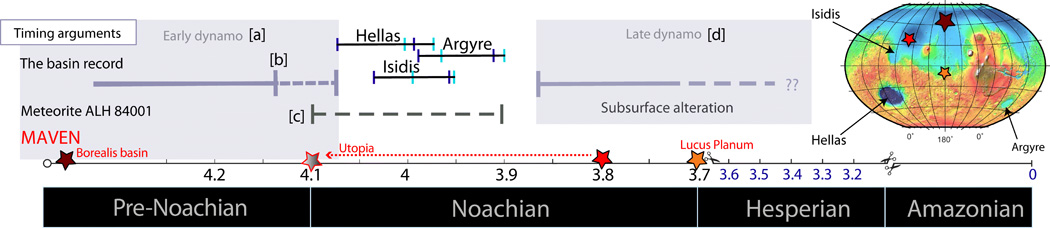
Timing of the Martian dynamo. Grey shading represents possible age constraints (in Ga years) for the early and late dynamo. Stars indicate new age constraints from MAVEN data. [a] Early dynamo before the formation of Hellas, Isidis, and Argyre. [b] The cessation of the early dynamo based on large basin population. [c] The age of ALH84001. [d] Late dynamo after the formation of the major basins.

=== Hemispheric magnetic dichotomy ===
One unresolved question is why the Martian crustal hemispheric dichotomy correlates to the magnetic dichotomy (and whether the origin of this dichotomy is an exogenic or endogenic process). One exogenic explanation is that the Borealis impact event resulted in thermal demagnetization of an initially magnetized northern hemisphere, but the proposed age of this event (~4.5 Ga) is long before the Martian dynamo termination (~4.0–4.1 Ga). An alternate model suggests that degree-1 mantle convection (i.e., a convective structure in which mantle upwelling dominates in one hemisphere but downwelling takes place in the other hemisphere) can produce a single-hemisphere dynamo.

=== Alternating stripes ===
One striking feature in Martian crustal magnetism is the long E–W trending alternating stripes on the southern hemisphere (Terra Cimmeria and Terra Sirenum). It has been proposed that these bands are formed by plate tectonic activity similar to the alternating magnetic polarity caused by seafloor crust spreading on Earth or the results of repeated dike intrusions. However, careful selection of the data analysis method is required to interpret these alternating stripes. Using sparse solutions (e.g., L1 regularization) of crustal-field measurements instead of smoothing solutions (e.g., L2 regularization) shows highly magnetized local patches (with the rest of the crust unmagnetized) instead of stripes. These patches might be formed by localized events such as volcanism or heating by impact events, which may not require continuous fields (e.g., intermittent dynamo).

=== Dynamo mechanisms ===
The dynamo mechanism of Mars is poorly understood but expected to be similar to the Earth's dynamo mechanism. Thermal convection due to the high thermal gradients in the hot, initial core was likely the primary mechanism for driving a dynamo early in Mars's history. As the mantle and core cooled over time, inner-core crystallization (which would provide latent heat) and chemical convection may have played a major role in driving the dynamo. Following inner-core formation, light elements migrated from the inner-core boundary into the liquid outer core and drove convection by buoyancy. However, even InSight lander data could not confirm the presence of Mars's solid inner core, and cannot exclude the possibility that there was no core crystallization (only thermal convection without chemical convection). Also, the possibility that magnetic fields may have been generated by a magma ocean cannot be ruled out.

It is also unclear when and by what mechanism the Martian dynamo shut down. A change in the cooling rate of the mantle may have caused the cessation of the Martian dynamo. One theory is giant impacts during the early and mid-Noachian periods stopped the dynamo by decreasing global heat flow at the core-mantle boundary.

The seismic measurements from the InSight lander revealed that the Martian outer core is in a liquid state and larger than expected. In one model, a partially crystallized Martian core explains the current state of Mars (i.e., lack of magnetic field despite liquid outer core), and this model predicts that the magnetic field has the potential to be reactivated in the future.

Possible dynamo mechanisms
Dynamo sources	Dynamo mechanisms	Notes	References
Thermal	Thermal convection	requires high temperature, high sulfur content; no solid inner core	
Thermal	Magma ocean	requires conductive silicate-dominated melts	
Thermocompositional	Chemical convection (Top-down crystallization)	requires low temperature, low thermal expansivity, low sulfur content; possible future dynamo reactivation	
Thermocompositional	Chemical convection (Bottom-up crystallization or iron snow)	requires low temperature, high thermal expansivity, high sulfur content; powers dynamo based on the light element partitioning coefficient	
Mechanical	Impact events	reduces global heat flow at the core mantle boundary and stops dynamo	

== See also ==
- Geology of Mars
- Mars carbonate catastrophe
