= Firsov (crater) =

Lunar impact crater on the far side of the Moon

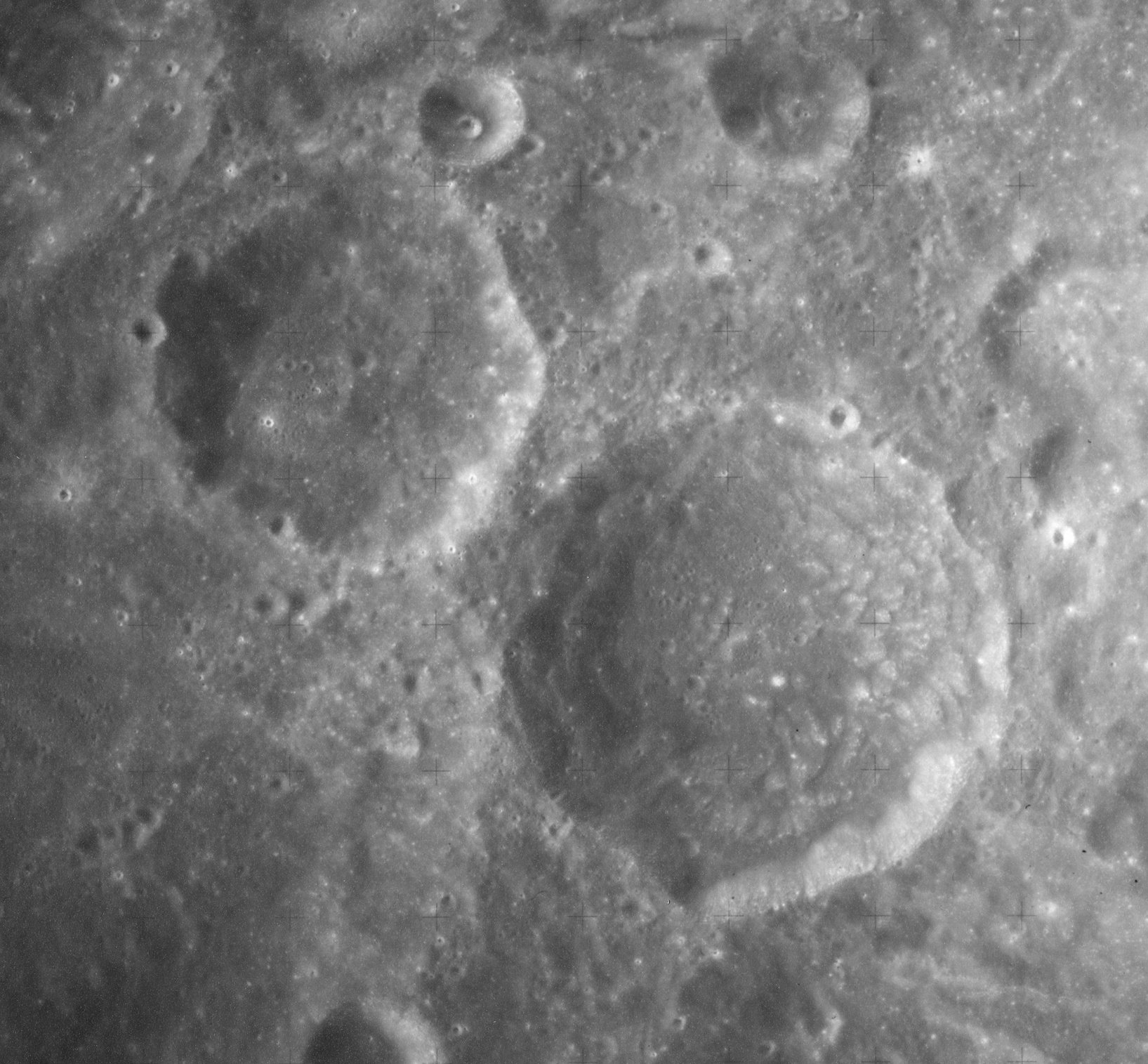
- Apollo 16 Mapping Camera image. Firsov below right of center, Firsov V above left of center
- Coordinates: 4.5°N 112.2°E
- Diameter: 51.00 km (31.69 mi)
- Depth: Unknown
- Colongitude: 248° at sunrise
- Eponym: Georgij F. Firsov

Firsov is a lunar impact crater on the far side of the Moon. It is located to due south of the crater Lobachevskiy, and to the northwest of Abul Wáfa. The circular rim of this crater has a small outward bulge along the southern edge, and smaller bulges along the western side. The inner walls have slumped to form talus piles along the base. The interior floor is nearly level and featureless.

Just east of Firsov, within an unnamed, flat-floored crater is an unusual swirl pattern of high albedo, similar to the floor of Mare Marginis and to the Reiner Gamma feature. This pattern is associated with a magnetic anomaly.

This formation is named after Soviet rocketry engineer Georgij Frolovich Fírsov (1917–1960). Its designation was formally adopted by the International Astronomical Union in 1970.

== Views ==
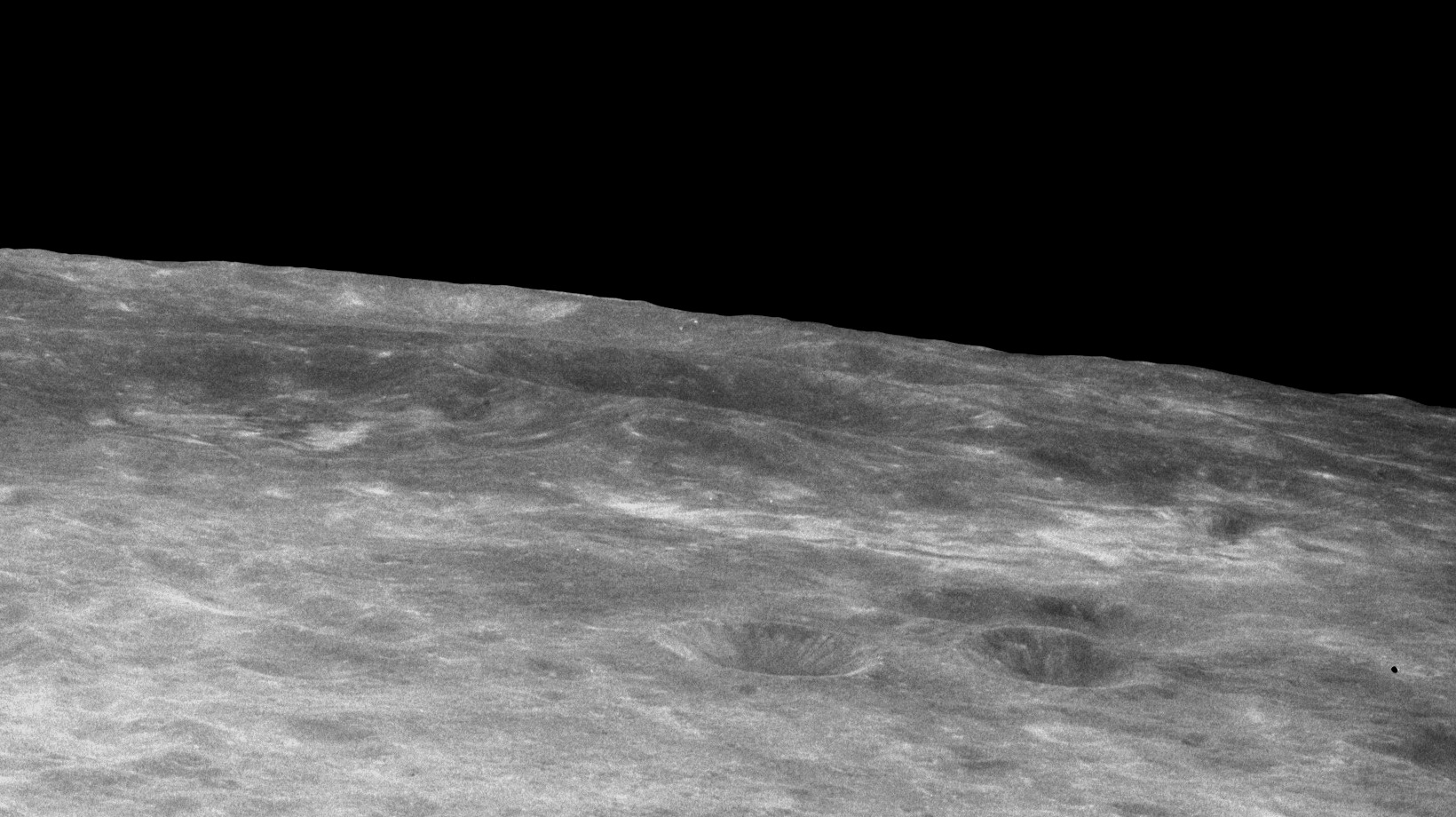
Oblique view with Firsov at center and high-albedo swirls in middle foreground, from Apollo 11

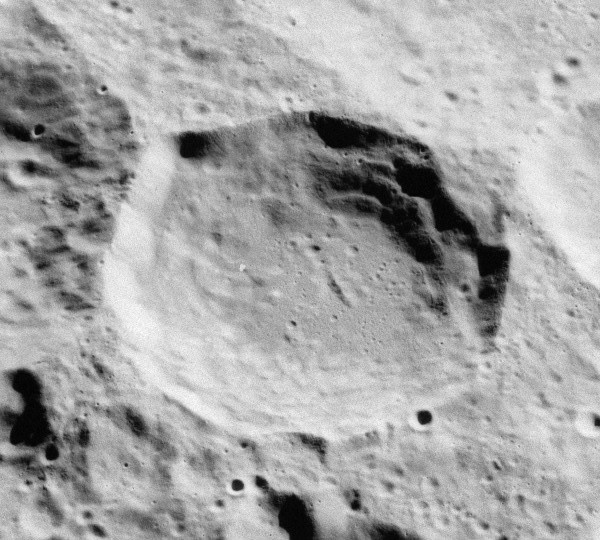
Oblique view facing southwest, from Apollo 16

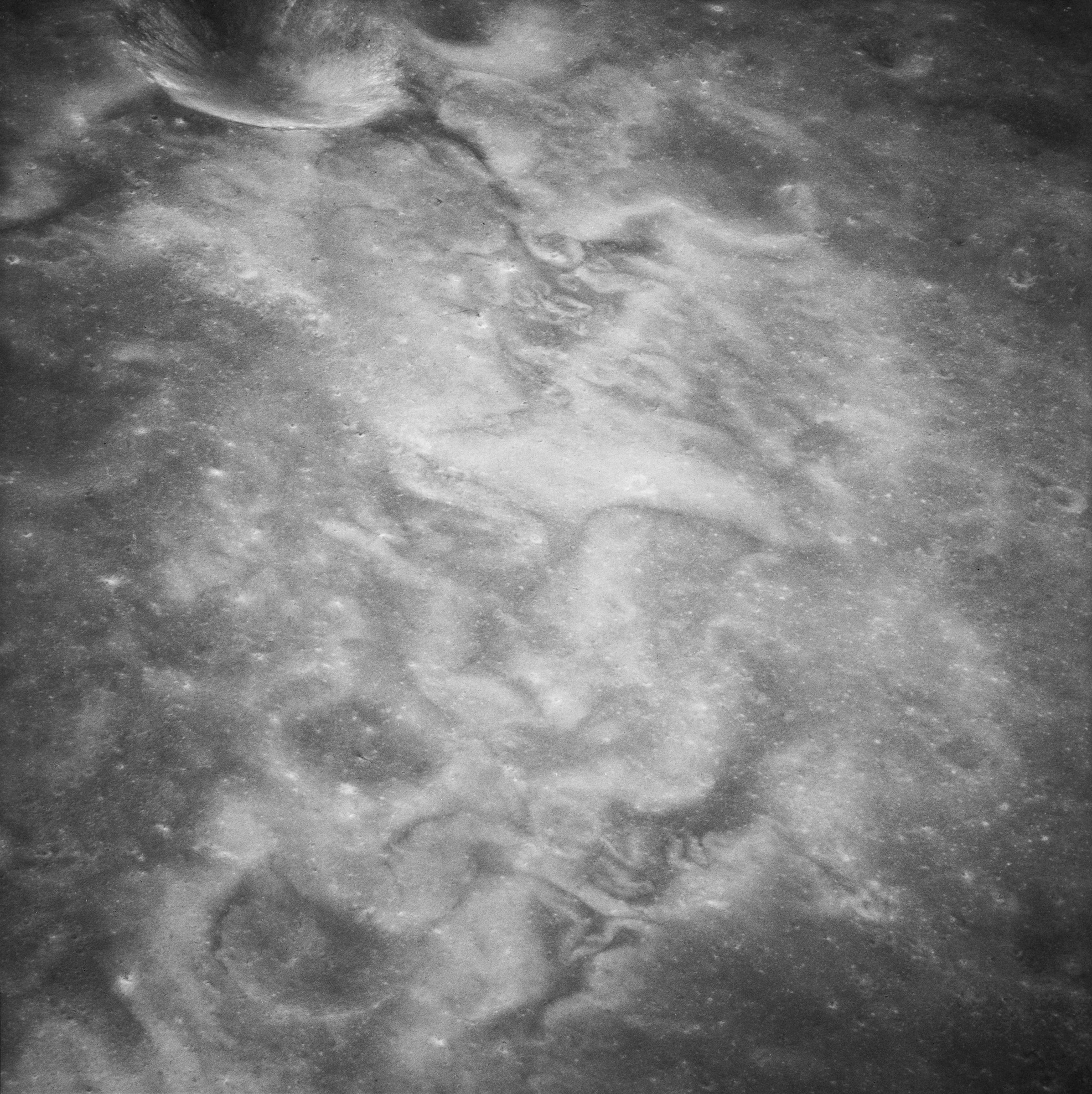
High-albedo swirls east of Firsov, from Apollo 10

== Satellite craters ==
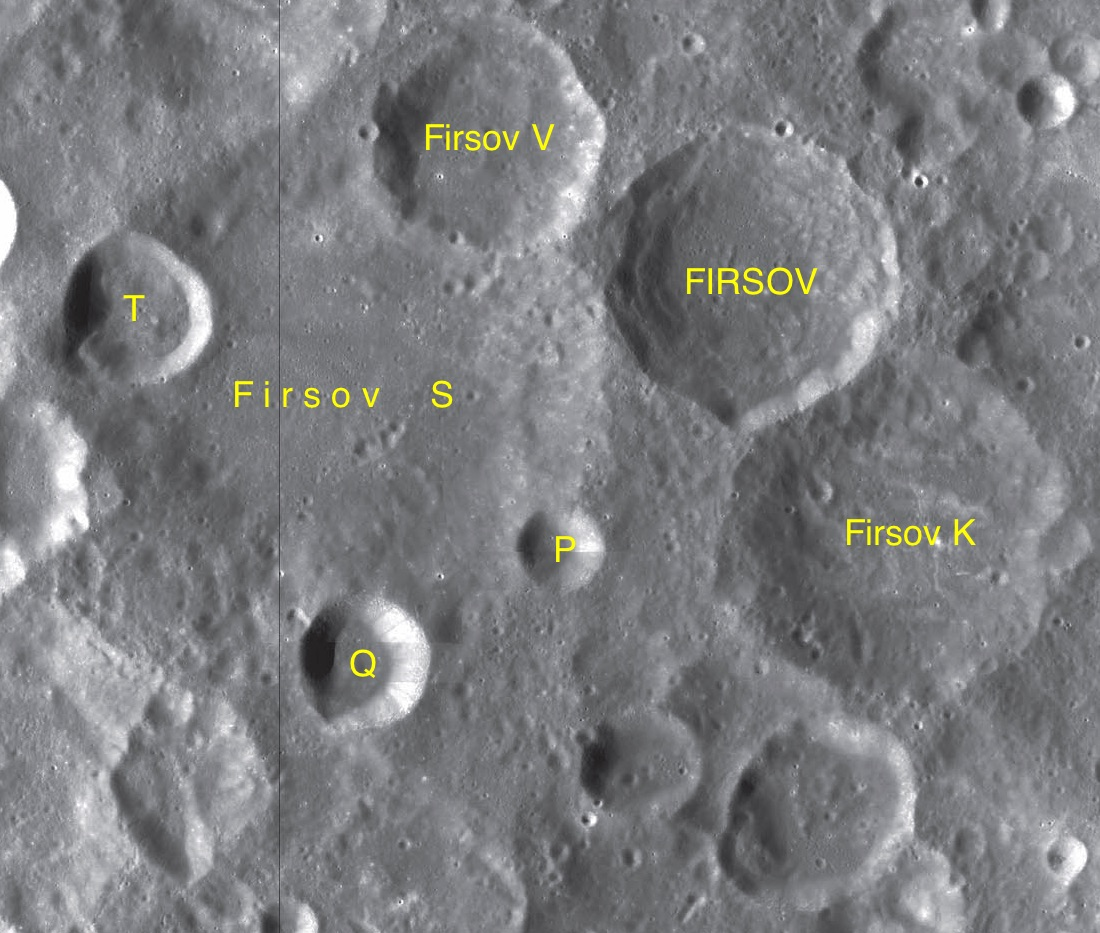
Firsov satellite features and surroundings

By convention, these features are identified on lunar maps by placing the letter on the side of the crater midpoint that is closest to Firsov.

Firsov	Latitude	Longitude	Diameter
K	3.1° N	113.0° E	58 km
P	2.9° N	111.1° E	15 km
Q	2.3° N	110.0° E	25 km
S	3.6° N	109.8° E	96 km
T	4.1° N	108.6° E	26 km
V	5.1° N	110.7° E	44 km

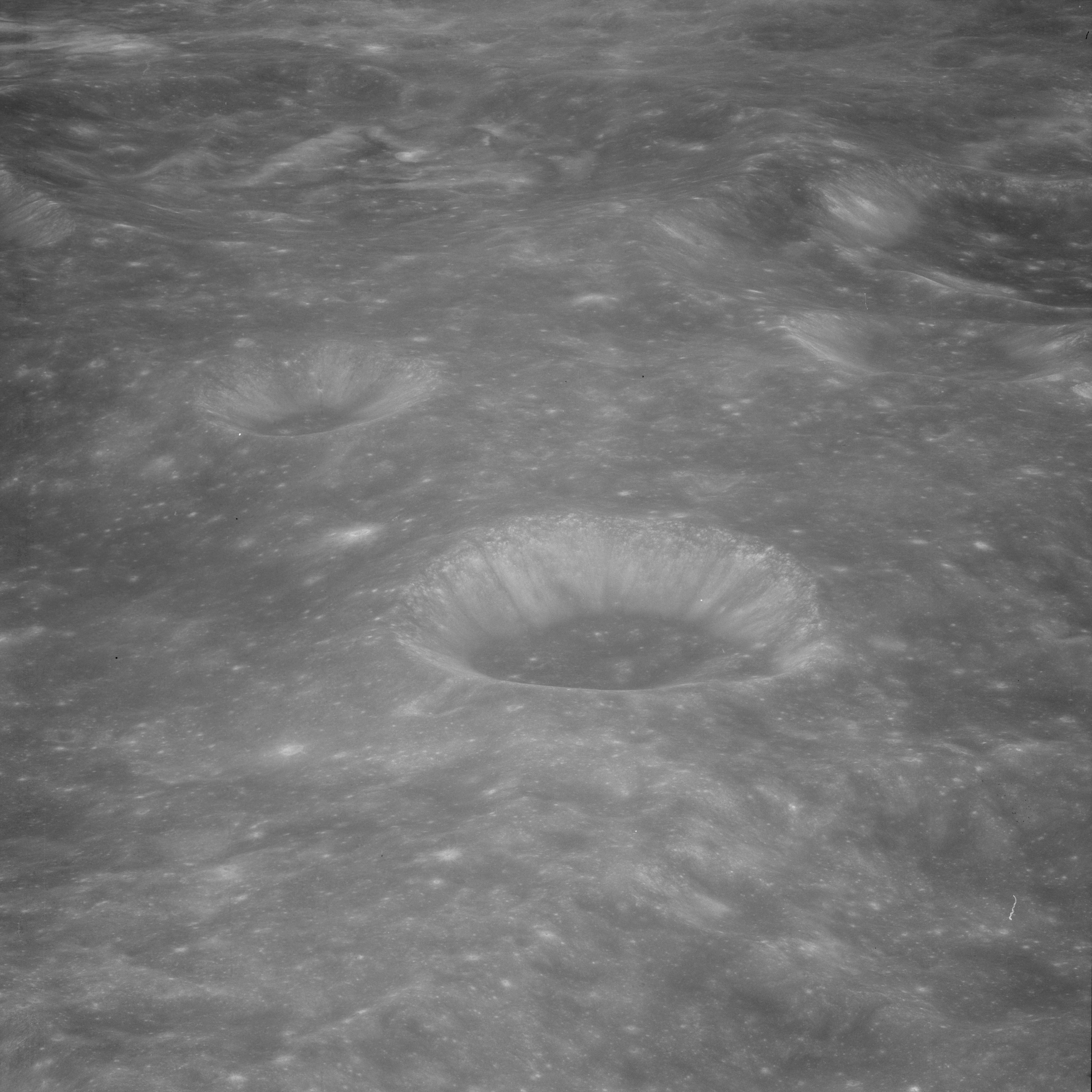
Firsov Q crater from Apollo 11
