= BOLAS (spacecraft) =

Moon-orbit spacecraft concept

Bi-sat Observations of the Lunar Atmosphere above Swirls (BOLAS)
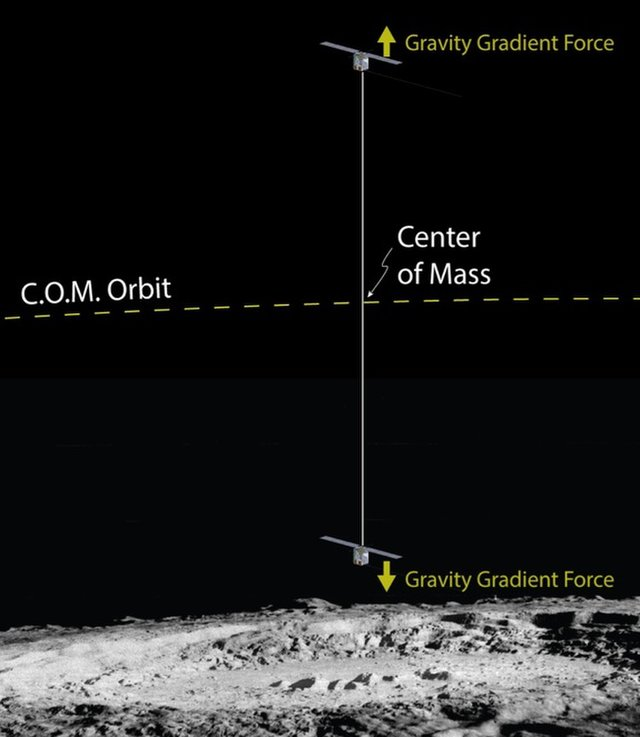
- Artist's rendering of the BOLAS concept. Vertical separation by the tether allows for a quasi-stable orbit and an extraordinary reduction in propellant requirement.
- Mission type: Reconnaissance, technology
- Operator: NASA
- Mission duration: ≥ 1 year (proposed)

Spacecraft properties
- Spacecraft type: Two tethered CubeSats
- Bus: 6U each
- Dry mass: ≈15 kg (33 lb) each
- Dimensions: 36×26×43 cm

Moon orbiter

Orbital parameters
- Periselene altitude: 10 km
- Aposelene altitude: 190 km
- Inclination: 30°

Bi-sat Observations of the Lunar Atmosphere above Swirls (BOLAS) is a spacecraft mission concept that would orbit the Moon at very low altitude in order to study the lunar surface. The concept, currently under study by NASA, involves two small identical CubeSat satellites connected vertically above the lunar surface by a 25 km long tether. The mission goal would be to understand the hydrogen cycle on the Moon, dust weathering, and the formation of lunar swirls.

== Overview ==
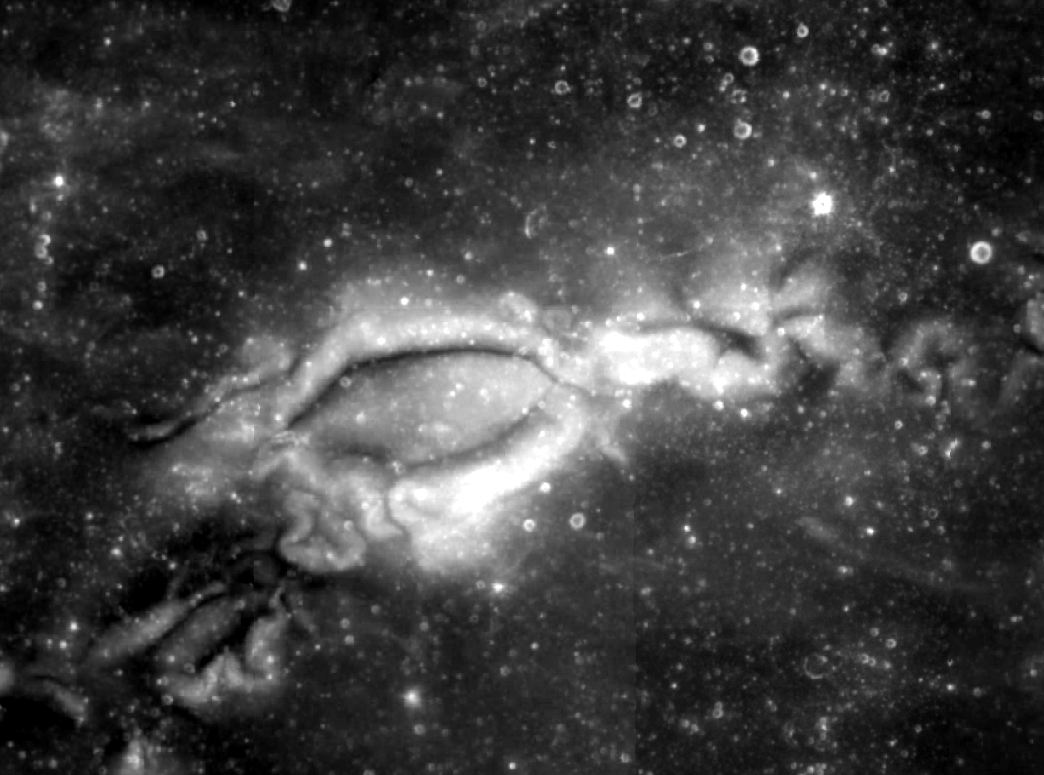
View of lunar swirls

BOLAS is a mission concept under study at NASA, with the goal of understanding the cycle of hydrogen on the Moon and to determine the formation mechanism of the lunar swirls. The mission would involve two small CubeSat satellites connected with a 25 km (16 mi) long space tether. The lower CubeSat would orbit at an altitude of 10 km (6.2 mi) above the surface. Without a tether system, a comparable low-altitude mission would need prohibitive amounts of fuel to maintain its orbit. The two tethered spacecraft would be placed at a 30° orbit inclination and would remain stable for more than one year.

The two CubeSats are 6 units each and would be equipped with nearly identical miniaturized instruments. The mission would use the subsystems developed by Kentucky's Morehead State University, which is leading NASA's Lunar IceCube mission. The team from NASA's Goddard Space Flight Center was selected in August 2017 to further mature the concept.

A bolas is a type of throwing weapon used by South American gauchos made of weights on the ends of interconnected cords. Its application in aerospace is called space bolas or momentum exchange tether.

== Objectives ==
The BOLAS mission would investigate the lunar hydrogen cycle by determining the mechanisms and dynamics of lunar hydrogen implantation, and their dependence on surface composition, regolith properties, local topography, plasma conditions, time-of-day, and crustal magnetic fields.

The second main objective is to understand the role that magnetic anomalies and space weathering could play in the formation of lunar swirls — enigmatic features found across the Moon's surface. The mission would also study regolith, local topography, plasma conditions, and magnetic fields within the crust.

Scientists think the lunar swirls form as a result of magnetic fields in the lunar crust, which protect the lighter-colored regolith either by diverting solar wind, or through the interaction with electric fields.

The Principal Investigator for the BOLAS mission is Timothy Stubbs, at NASA's Goddard Space Flight Center.

== Spacecraft ==
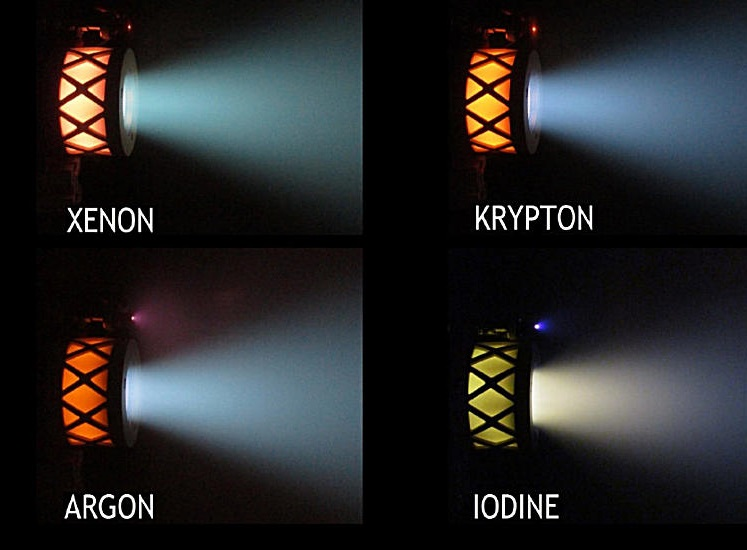
Busek's BIT-3 ion thruster operating on several propellants

The two CubeSats are 6 units each, measuring 36×26×43 cm each, not including their deployable solar panels. The higher satellite is called BOLAS-H, and the lower one is BOLAS-L. Both would operate independently and possess their own propulsion featuring two Busek BIT-3 RF ion engines each. They would also feature an attitude control system (ACS), and an X band transponder for communication.

The 25 kilometer long space tether joining the two satellites is made of a commercially available high tenacity yarn with a thickness of 125 μm that is braided for redundant tensile strength.

=== Science instruments ===
The two CubeSats are 6 units each and would be equipped with nearly identical miniaturized instruments:

- Energetic Neutral Atom Imager (ENAI) (lower CubeSat only) to detect neutralized solar wind.
- Ion spectrometer for measuring protons (H^{+}).
- Magnetometer to measure local magnetic fields.
- Plasma Wave System (PWS) for measuring electron concentrations, electric fields, and dust impacts.
- Camera.

== See also ==
- Lunar IceCube, a planned lunar CubeSat mission
- Lunar Polar Hydrogen Mapper, a planned lunar CubeSat mission
