= Galilaei (lunar crater) =

Crater on the Moon

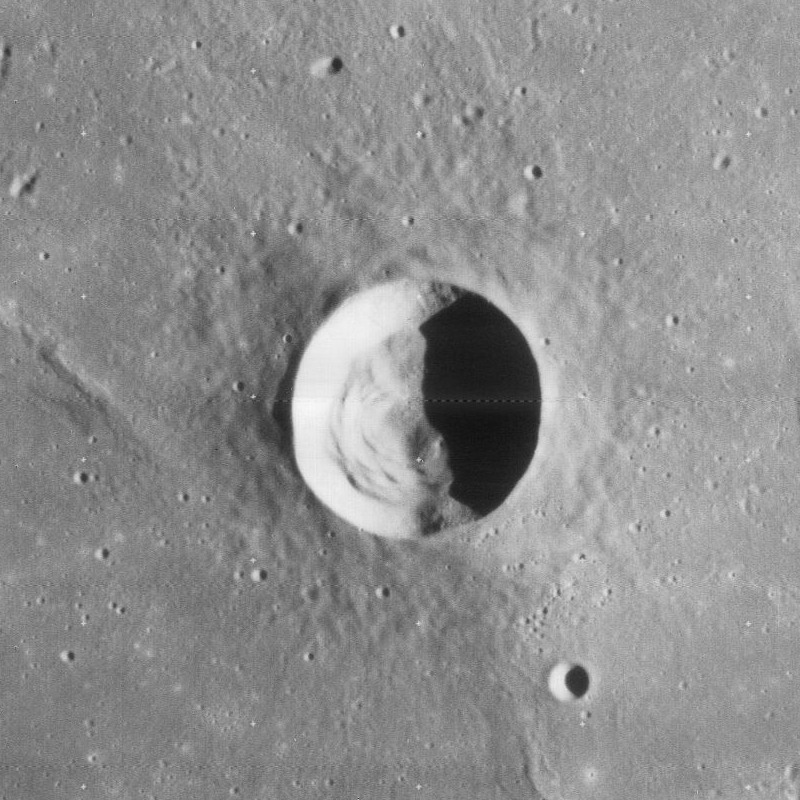
- Lunar Orbiter 4 image
- Coordinates: 10.5°N 62.7°W
- Diameter: 15.99 km (9.94 mi)
- Depth: 1.4 km (0.87 mi)
- Colongitude: 63° at sunrise
- Eponym: Galileo Galilei

Galilaei is a small lunar impact crater located in the western Oceanus Procellarum. Some distance to the southeast is the crater Reiner, while to the south-southwest is Cavalerius. Northeast of the crater is a meandering rille named the Rima Galilaei. To the southeast is the unusual Reiner Gamma formation, a swirling arrangement of light-hued ray-like material.

This is relatively undistinguished feature, with a sharp-edged rim that has a higher albedo than the surrounding maria and a skirt of ejecta. It shows little degradation and has no overlapping craters of note. The inner walls slope down to a ring of debris on the outer edges of the interior floor. Closeup imagery of the sides show parallel layers from the original underlying mare material. There is a small central rise near the midpoint.

To the south, between Galilaei and Cavalerius, is the landing site of the Luna 9 robotic probe, the first such vehicle to make a controlled landing on the lunar surface.

Despite being the first person to publish astronomical observations of the Moon with a telescope, the Italian scientist Galileo Galilei is honored only with this unremarkable formation. Initially, the name Galilaeus had been applied by Giovanni Battista Riccioli, an Italian Jesuit who produced one of the first detailed maps of the Moon in 1651, to a large and bright nearby albedo feature (now known as Reiner Gamma).

The name was transferred to its present location by Johann Heinrich Mädler in his influential Mappa Selenographica, published in collaboration with Wilhelm Beer in four parts between 1834 and 1836. Mädler's motive for this change was that his lunar map did not name albedo features, forcing him to transfer Galileo's name to an insignificant nearby crater. The modern designation was officially adopted by the International Astronomical Union in 1935.

== Satellite craters ==
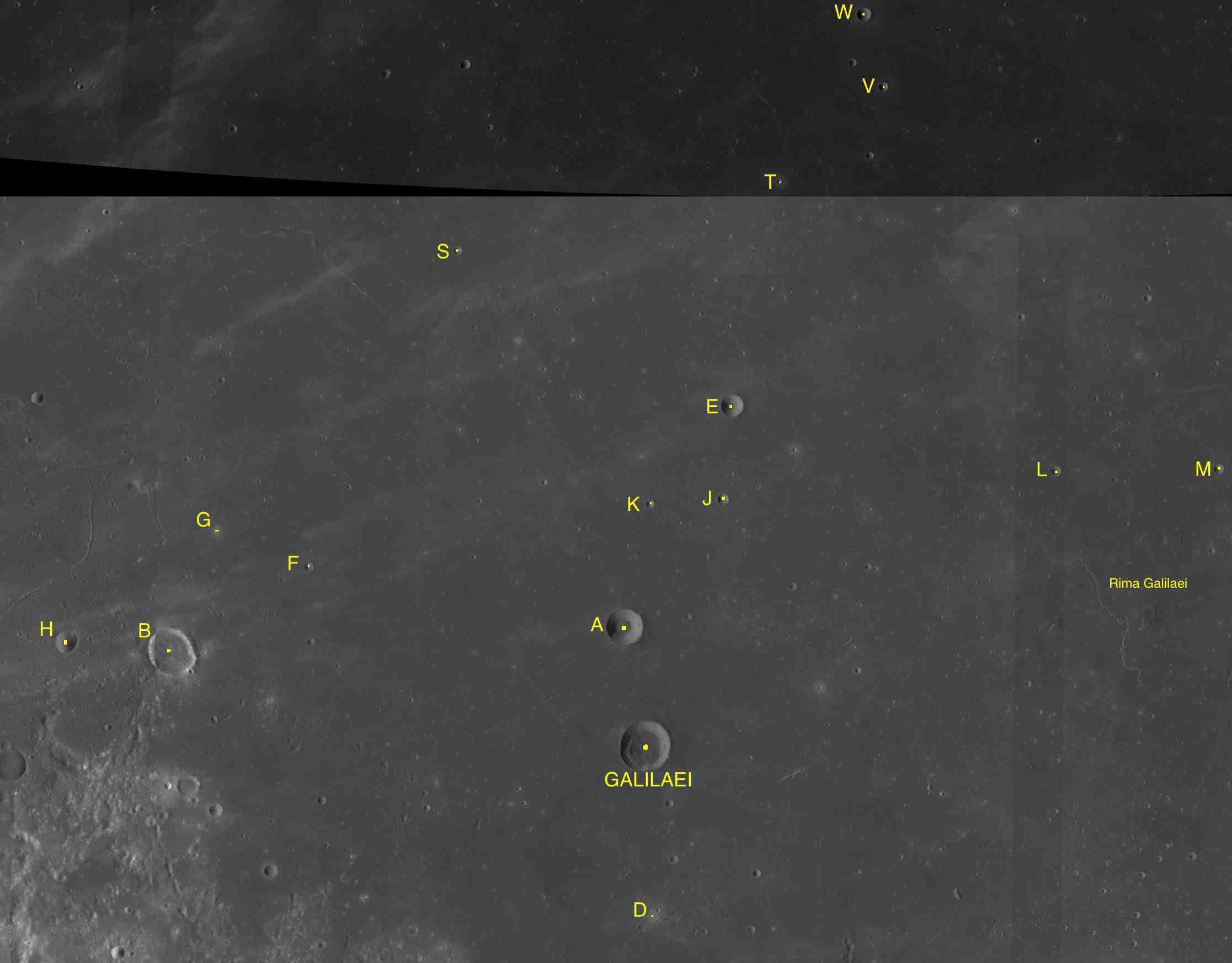
Satellite features of Galilaei

By convention these features are identified on lunar maps by placing the letter on the side of the crater midpoint that is closest to Galilaei.

Galilaei	Latitude	Longitude	Diameter
A	11.7° N	62.9° W	11 km
B	11.4° N	67.6° W	15 km
D	8.7° N	62.7° W	1 km
E	14.0° N	61.8° W	7 km
F	12.3° N	66.2° W	3 km
G	12.7° N	67.1° W	1 km
H	11.5° N	68.7° W	7 km
J	13.0° N	61.9° W	4 km
K	13.0° N	62.7° W	3 km
L	13.2° N	58.5° W	3 km
M	13.3° N	56.8° W	3 km
S	15.4° N	64.7° W	2 km
T	16.2° N	61.4° W	2 km
V	17.1° N	60.3° W	3 km
W	17.8° N	60.5° W	4 km
