= Lunar swirls =

Enigmatic features on the lunar surface

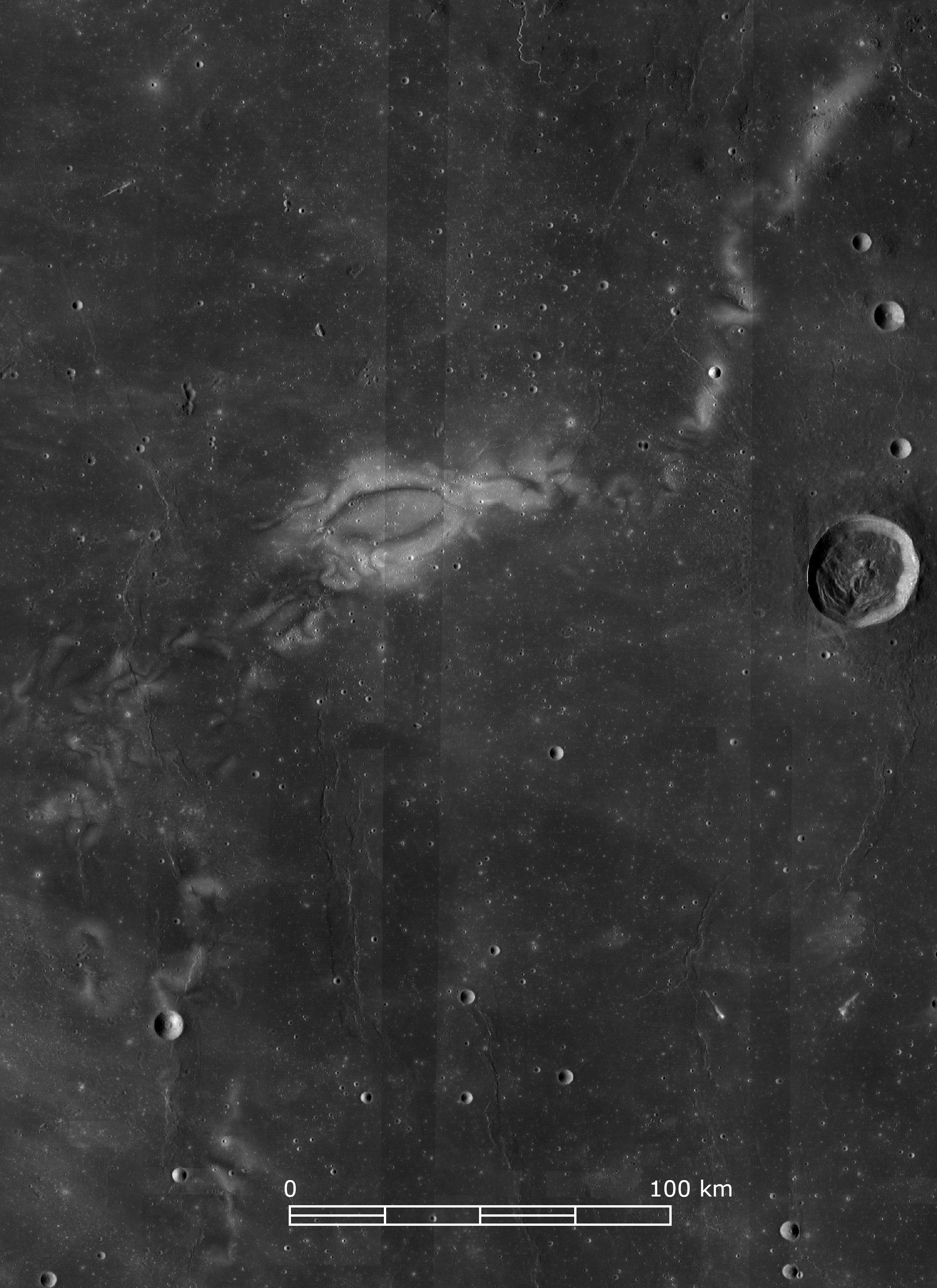
LRO image of Reiner Gamma

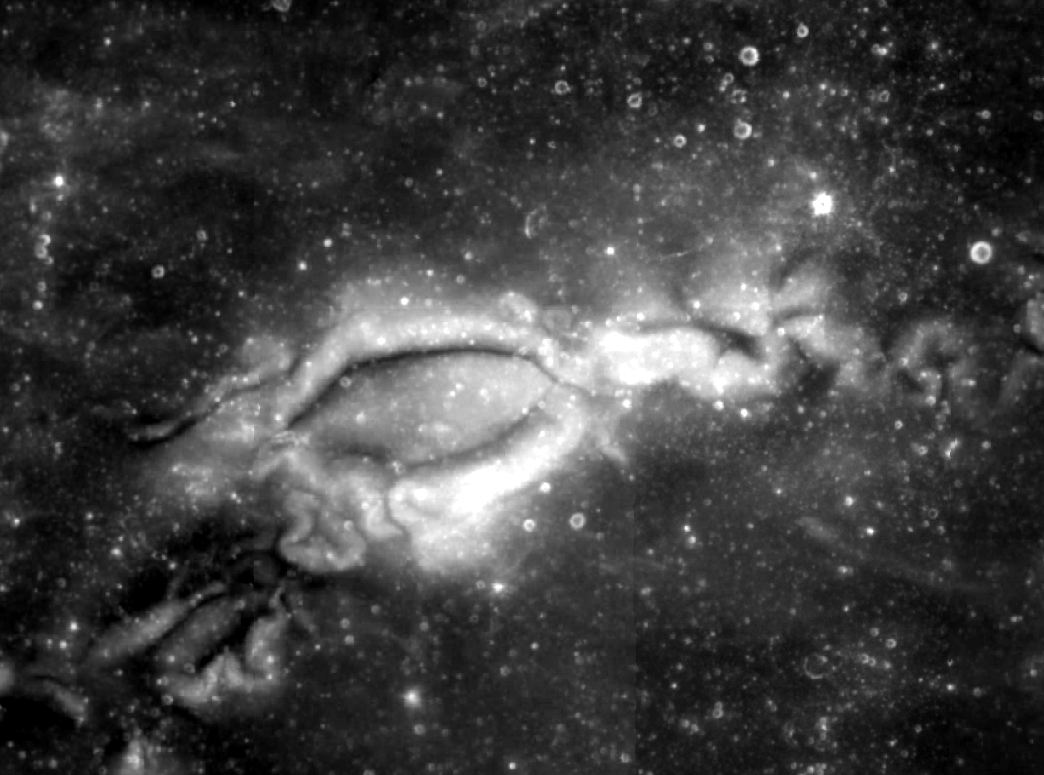
Another view of Reiner Gamma swirls

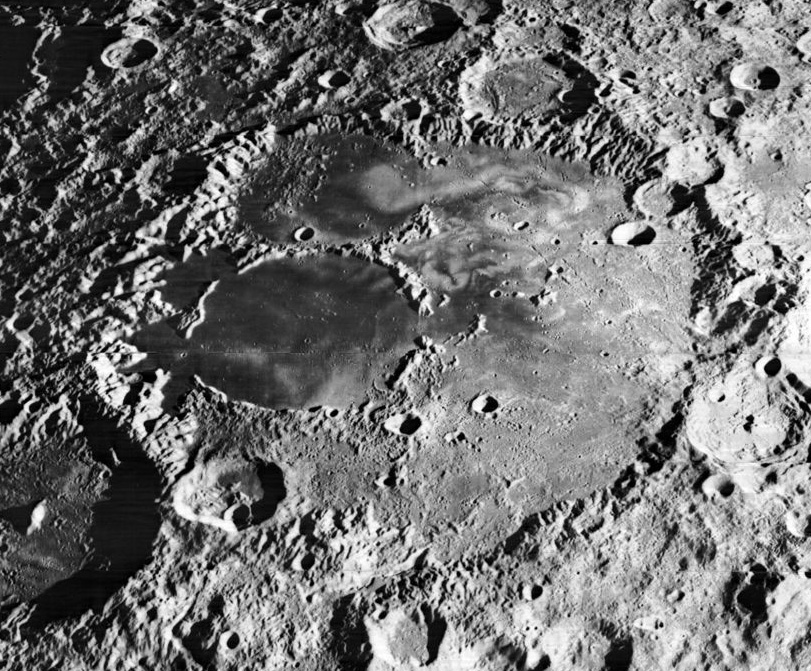
Mare Ingenii

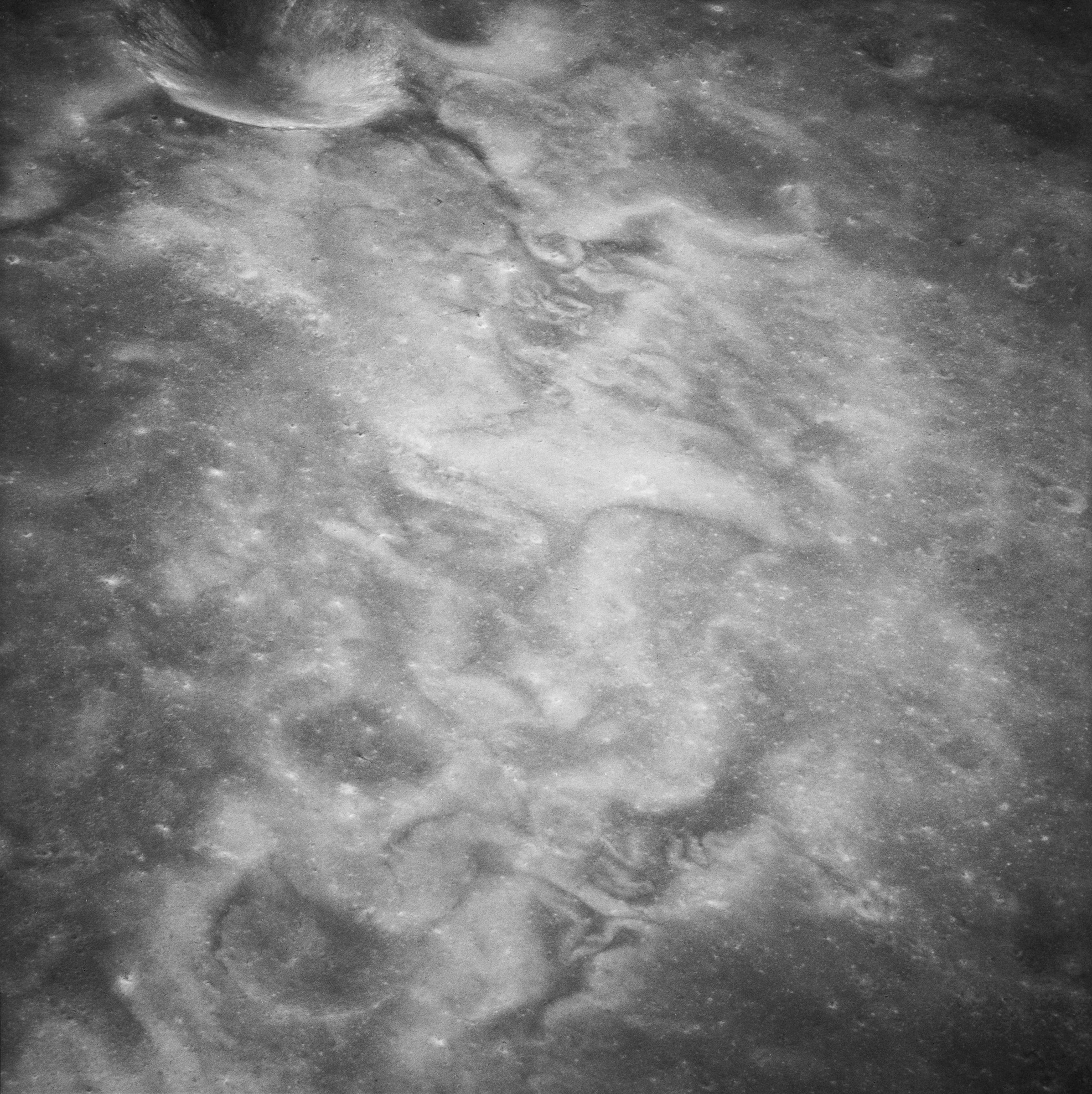
Swirls east of Firsov crater, Apollo 10

Lunar swirls are enigmatic features found across the Moon's surface, which are characterized by having a high albedo, appearing optically immature (i.e. having the optical characteristics of a relatively young regolith), and (often) having a sinuous shape. Their curvilinear shape is often accentuated by low albedo regions that wind between the bright swirls. They appear to overlay the lunar surface, superposed on craters and ejecta deposits, but impart no observable topography. Swirls have been identified on the lunar maria and on highlands – they are not associated with a specific lithologic composition. Swirls on the maria are characterized by strong albedo contrasts and complex, sinuous morphology, whereas those on highland terrain appear less prominent and exhibit simpler shapes, such as single loops or diffuse bright spots.

== Association with magnetic anomalies ==
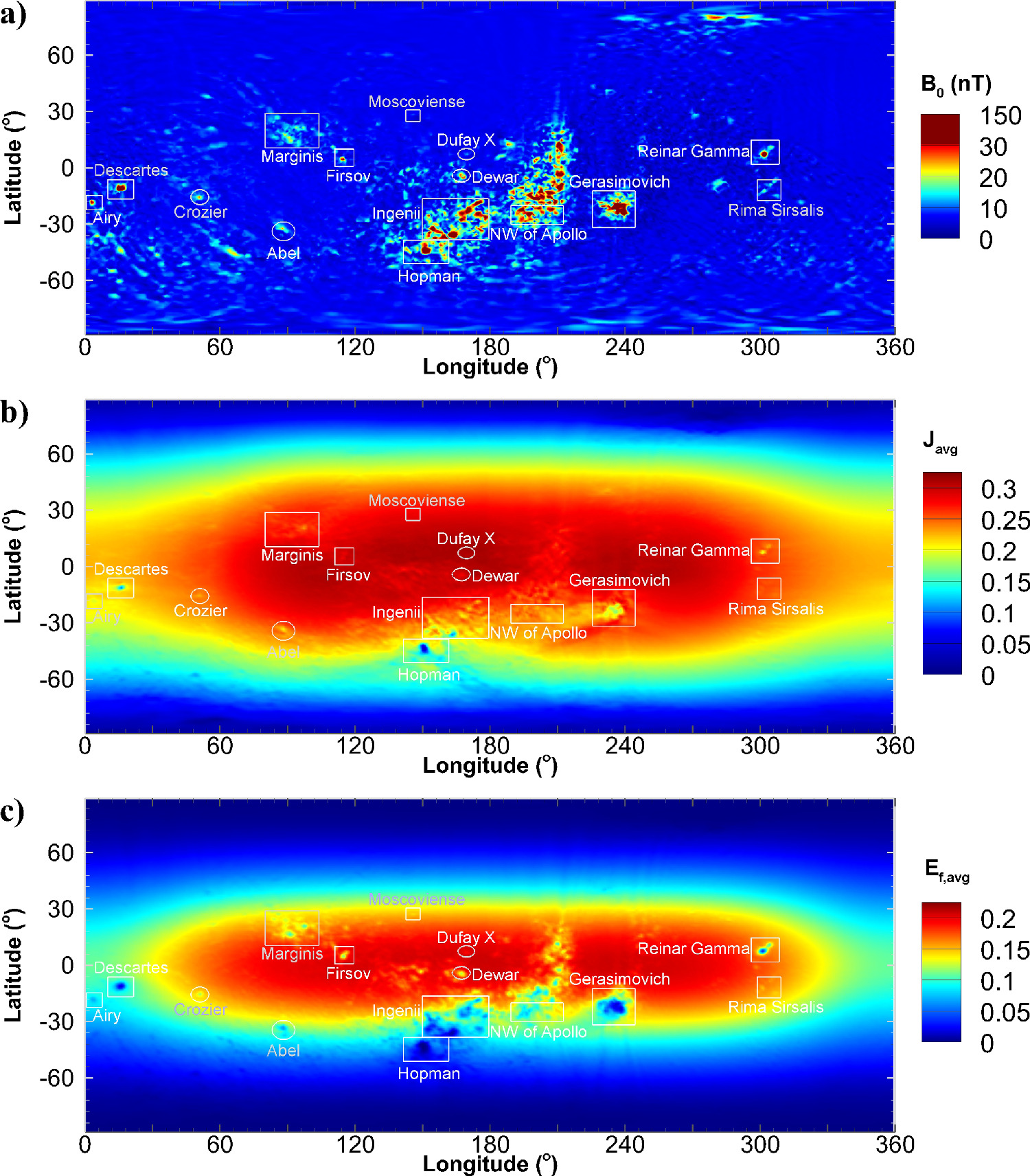
(a) map of the magnetic field strength on the lunar surface, (b) and (c) maps of average number fluxes of solar wind over one lunation

The lunar swirls are coincident with regions of the magnetic field of the Moon with relatively high strength on a planetary body that lacks, and may never have had, an active core dynamo with which to generate its own magnetic field. Every swirl has an associated magnetic anomaly, but not every magnetic anomaly has an identifiable swirl. Orbital magnetic field mapping by the Apollo 15 and 16 sub-satellites, Lunar Prospector, and Kaguya show regions with a local magnetic field. Because the Moon has no currently active global magnetic field, these regional anomalies are regions of remnant magnetism; their origin remains controversial.

== Formation models ==
There are three leading models for swirl formation. Each model must address two characteristics of lunar swirls formation, namely that a swirl is optically immature, and that it is associated with magnetic anomaly.

Models for creation of the magnetic anomalies associated with lunar swirls point to the observation that several of the magnetic anomalies are antipodal to the younger, large impact basins on the Moon.

=== Cometary impact model ===
This model argues that the high albedo of the swirls is the result of an impact with a comet. The impact would cause scouring of the top-most surface regolith by the comet’s turbulent flow of gas and dust, which exposed fresh material and redeposited the fine, scoured material in discrete deposits. According to this model, the associated strong magnetic anomalies are the result of magnetization of near-surface materials heated above the Curie temperature through hyper-velocity gas collisions and micro-impacts as the comet impacted the surface. Proponents of the cometary impact model consider the occurrence of many swirls antipodal to the major basins to be coincidental or the result of incomplete mapping of swirl locations.

=== Solar wind shielding model ===
This model argues that swirls are formed because lighter-colored regolith is protected from the solar wind due to a magnetic anomaly. The swirls represent exposed silicate materials whose albedos have been selectively preserved over time from the effects of space weathering via deflection of solar wind ion bombardment. According to this model, optical maturation of exposed silicate surfaces is a result of solar wind ion bombardment. This model suggests that swirl formation is a continuing process, which began after creation of the magnetic anomaly.

Mathematical simulations conducted in 2018 showed that lava tubes could have become magnetic as they cooled, which would provide a magnetic field consistent with the observations near the lunar swirls.

=== Dust transport model ===
This model argues that weak electric fields created by interaction between the crustal magnetic anomalies and the solar wind plasma could attract or repel electrically charged fine dust. High–albedo feldspathic material is the dominant component of the finest particles of lunar soil. Electrostatic movement of dust lofted above the surface during terminator crossings could cause this material to preferentially accumulate and form the bright, looping swirl patterns.

== Satellite measurements ==
Direct magnetic observations of the lunar swirls have been conducted by several lunar spacecraft, including Clementine and Lunar Prospector. The results of these observations are inconsistent with the Cometary impact model. Further observations by the Lunar Reconnaissance Orbiter support the model that solar wind is being deflected by a magnetic field.

Spectral observations by the Moon Mineralogy Mapper instrument on Chandrayaan-1 confirmed that the lighter-colored regions are deficient in hydroxide, which also supports the hypothesis that solar wind is being deflected in the pale areas.

As of 2018, a CubeSat mission concept is under study at NASA, with the goal of understanding the formation of the lunar swirls. The proposed Bi-sat Observations of the Lunar Atmosphere above Swirls, or BOLAS mission would involve two small satellites connected with a 25 km (16 mi) space tether. The lower CubeSat would orbit at an altitude of six miles above the surface.

== Exploration ==
=== Lunar Vertex ===
NASA intends to send a rover to Reiner Gamma to obtain in-situ observations of the surface materials there. The Lunar Vertex mission, run by the JHU Applied Physics Laboratory, will fly on Intuitive Machines IM-3 lander in 2027. A MAPP rover carrying a multispectral microscope will determine coarseness and brightness of surface particles and transmit its data to the lander, which will communicate with Earth-based handlers.

== See also ==
- Transient lunar phenomenon – Short-lived light, color, or change in appearance on the surface of the Moon
- Albedo feature – Region of a planet's surface which contrasts in brightness to its surroundings
