= Reiner Gamma =

Geographical feature of the Moon

Reiner gamma
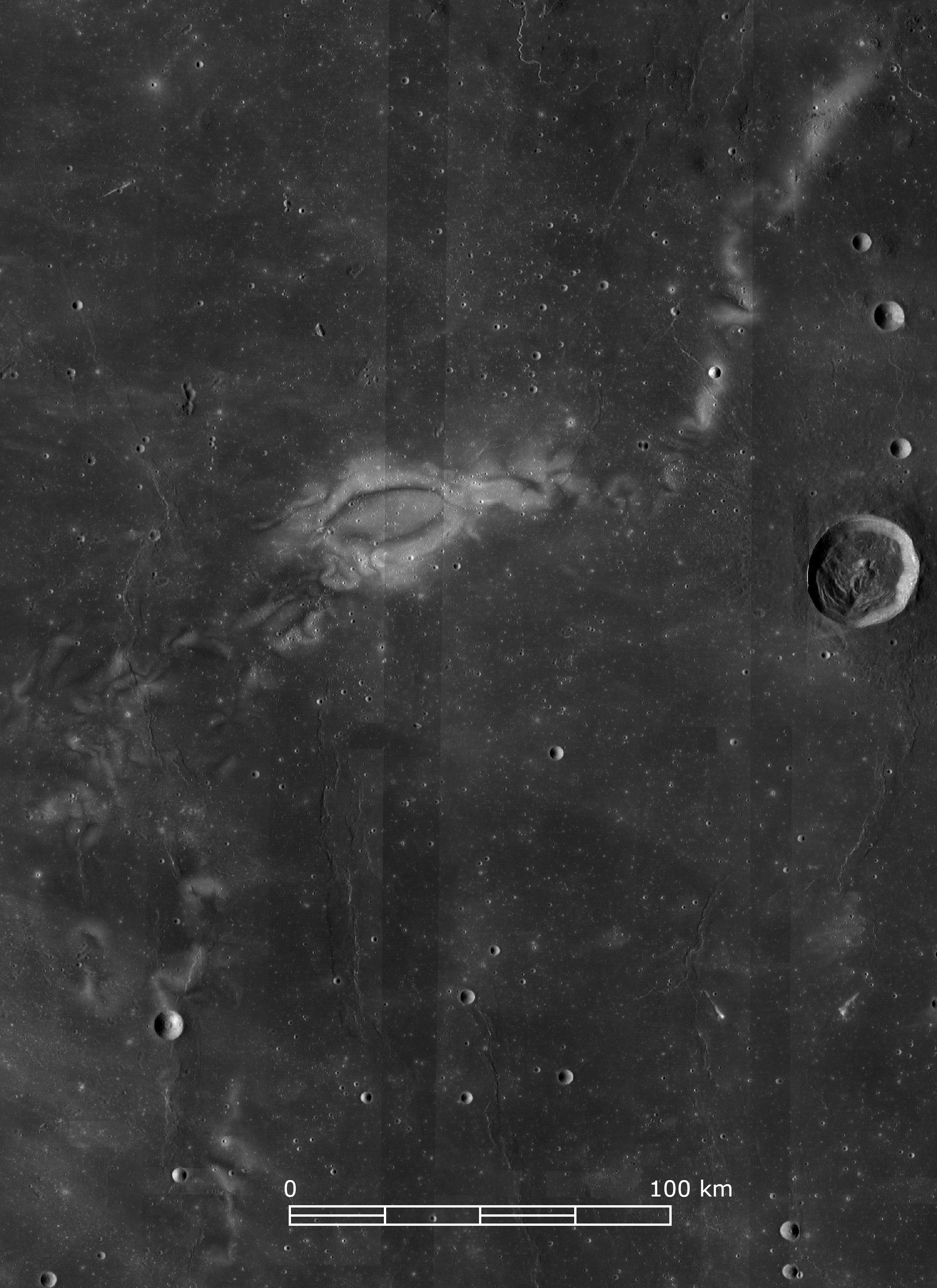
- Lunar Reconnaissance Orbiter Wide Angle Camera image of Reiner Gamma.
- Coordinates: 7.5°N 59.0°W
- Diameter: 73.44 km (45.63 mi)
- Eponym: Reiner crater

Reiner Gamma (γ) is a geographical feature of the Moon known as a lunar swirl. It is one of the most visible lunar swirls from Earth, visible from most telescopes. It was originally thought to be a lunar highland, but scientists eventually realized that it cast no shadow on the moon. In contrast to many ray systems, it remains prominent even under a low Sun.

== Name ==
In early lunar maps by Francesco Maria Grimaldi, this feature was incorrectly identified as a crater. His colleague Giovanni Riccioli then named it Galilaeus, after Galileo Galilei. The name was later transferred northwest to the current crater Galilaei. The feature is now named after Italian astronomer and mathematician Vincentio Reinieri (unknown–1648). Its designation was officially adopted by the International Astronomical Union in 1935.

== Description ==
Reiner Gamma is located on the Oceanus Procellarum, west of the crater Reiner. Its center is located at selenographic coordinates 7.5°N 59.0°W. It lies across a wrinkle ridge and has an overall length of about 70 kilometres. The feature has a higher albedo than the relatively dark mare surface, with a diffuse appearance and a distinctive swirling, concentric oval shape. Related albedo features continue across the surface to the east and southwest, forming loop-like patterns over the mare.

The central feature of Reiner Gamma resembles the dipolar formation created by iron filings on a surface with a bar magnet on the underside. Low-orbiting spacecraft have observed a relatively strong magnetic field associated with each of these albedo markings. Some have speculated that this magnetic field and the patterns were created by cometary impacts. However the true cause remains uncertain.

Reiner Gamma's magnetic field strength is approximately 15 nT, measured from an altitude of 28 km. This is one of the strongest localized magnetic anomalies on the Moon. The surface field strength of this feature is sufficient to form a mini-magnetosphere that spans 360 km at the surface, forming a 300 km thick region of enhanced plasma where the solar wind flows around the field. As the particles in the solar wind are known to darken the lunar surface, the magnetic field at this site may account for the survival of this albedo feature.

== Origin ==
The origin of Reiner Gamma—like other lunar swirls—is not completely understood. It is associated with a localized magnetic field, but not with any particular irregularities in the surface. Similar features have been discovered in Mare Ingenii and Mare Marginis by orbiting spacecraft. The feature on Mare Ingenii is located at the lunar opposite point from the center of Mare Imbrium. Likewise the feature on Mare Marginis is opposite the midpoint of Mare Orientale. Hence, one hypothesis is that the feature resulted from seismic energies generated by the impacts that created these maria. However, no such lunar mare formation is on the opposite side of the Moon from Reiner Gamma. Instead, it is oriented approximately radially to the Imbrian basin and so may be related to magnetized ejecta from that source.

== Exploration ==
NASA and Intuitive Machines plan to land the IM-3 mission in the Reiner Gamma region in 2027. The mission's Lunar Vertex payload is designed to study the lunar swirl environment.

== Gallery ==
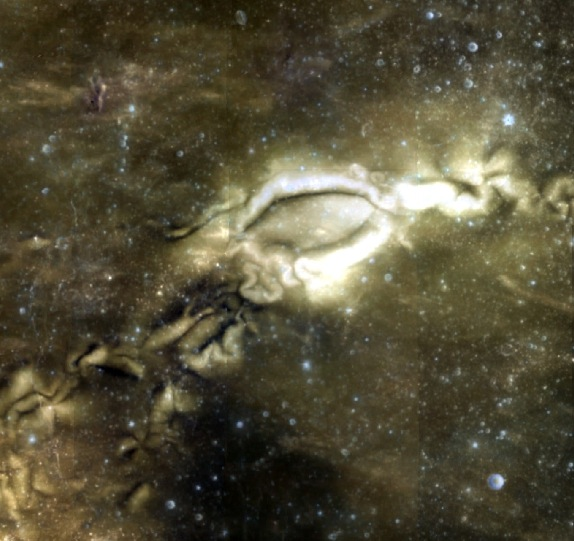
NASA Clementine UV-VIS color image of Reiner Gamma

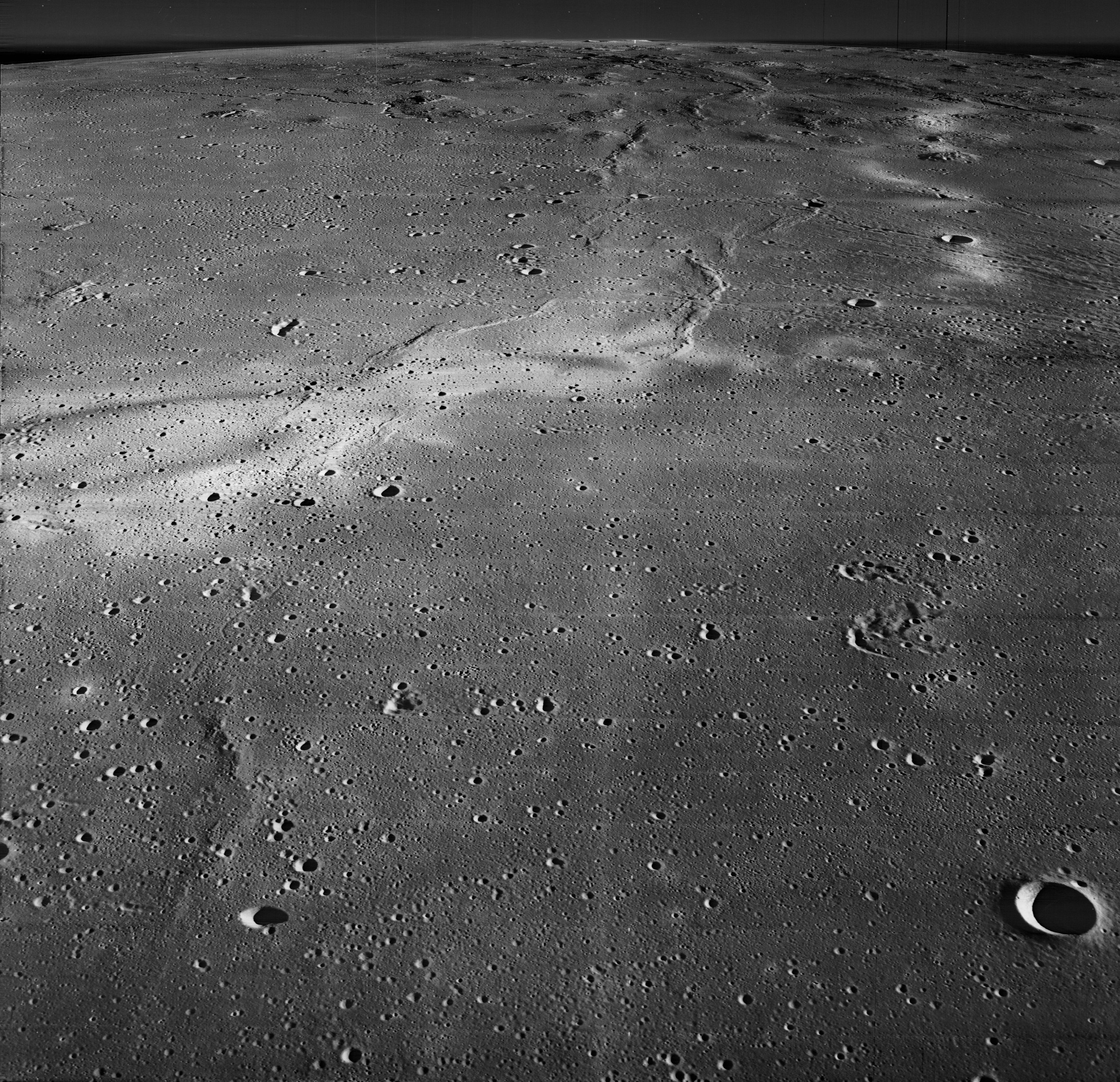
Oblique view from Lunar Orbiter 2, with the Marius Hills in the background.

Beginning with a full-globe view of the lunar near side, the camera flies to a close-up, increasingly oblique view of the lunar swirl.

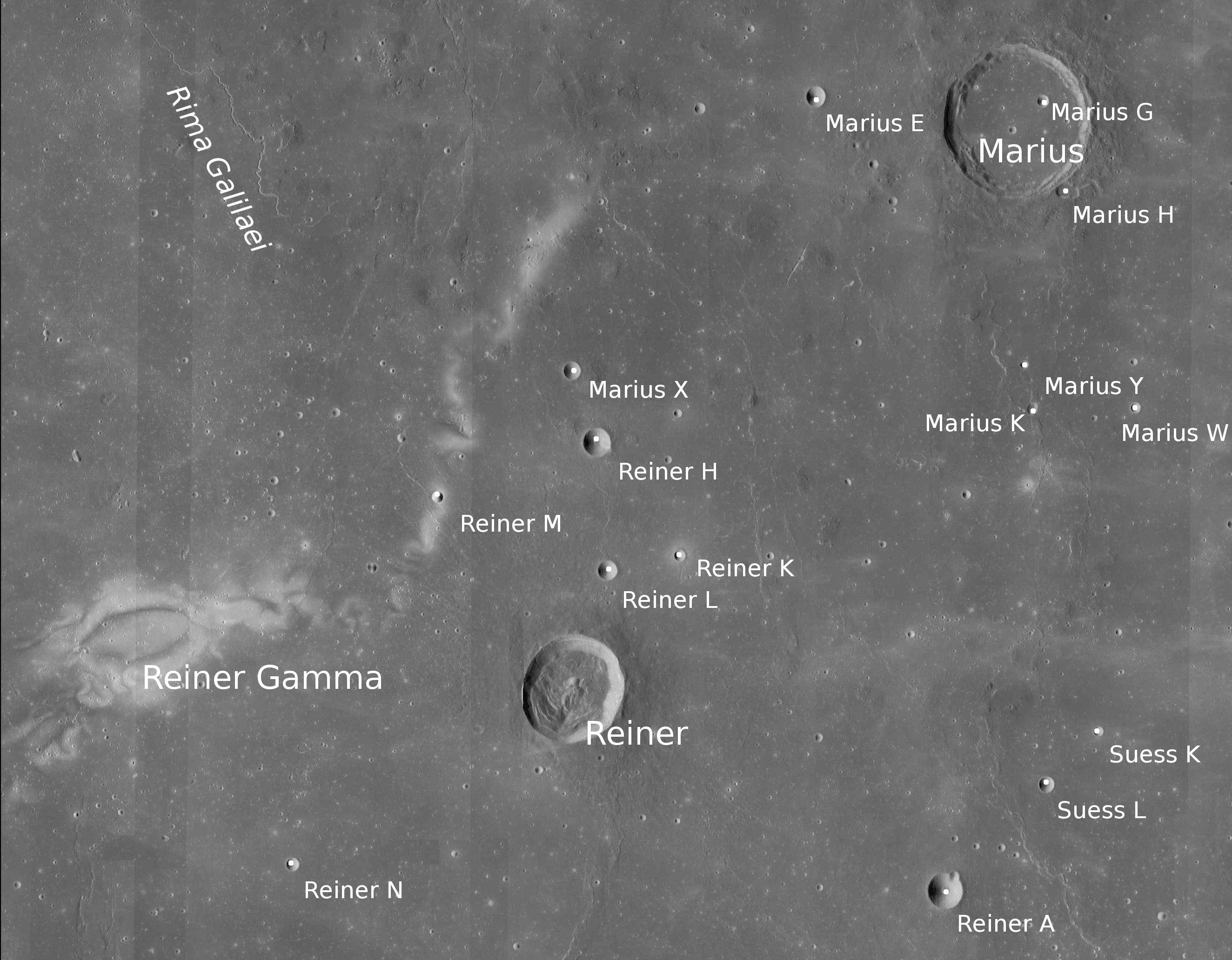
Reiner and Marius areas
