= Reiner (crater) =

Crater on the Moon

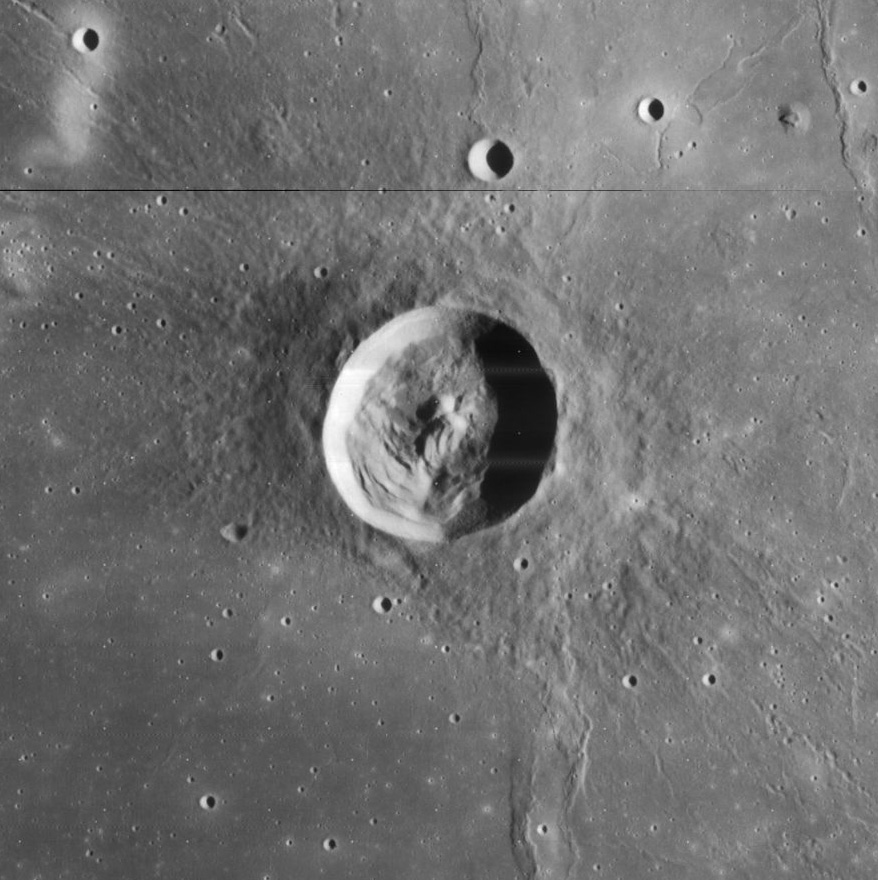
- Lunar Orbiter 4 image
- Coordinates: 7.0°N 54.9°W
- Diameter: 30 km
- Depth: 2.6 km
- Colongitude: 55° at sunrise
- Formation: Eratosthenian
- Eponym: Vincentio Reinieri

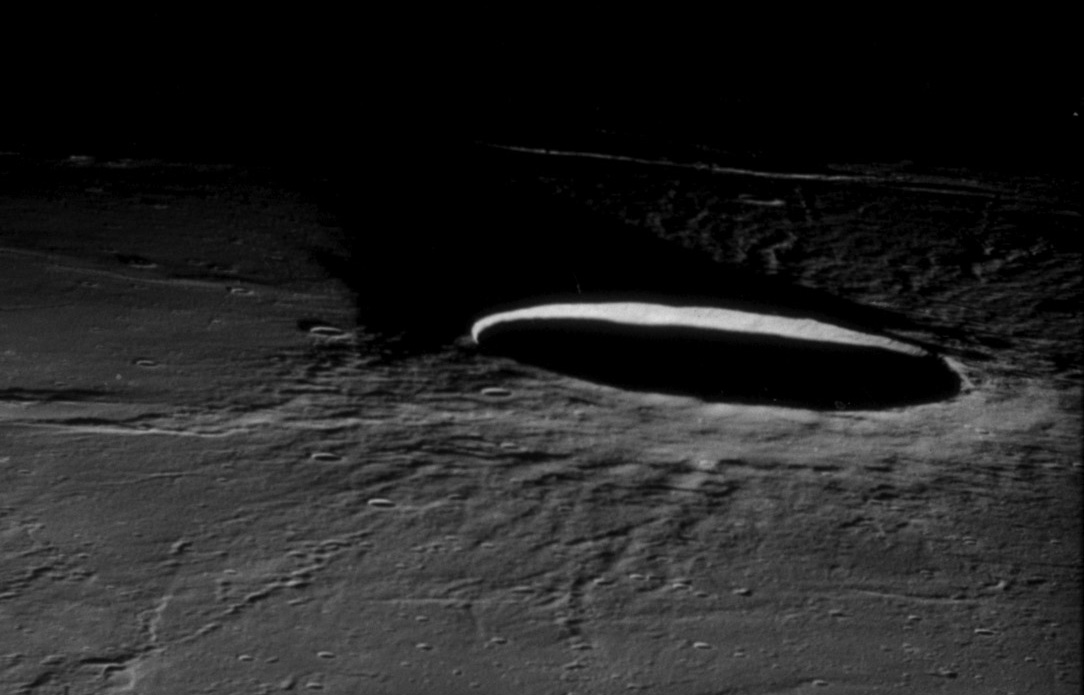
Oblique view of Reiner at the terminator facing west, from Apollo 12.

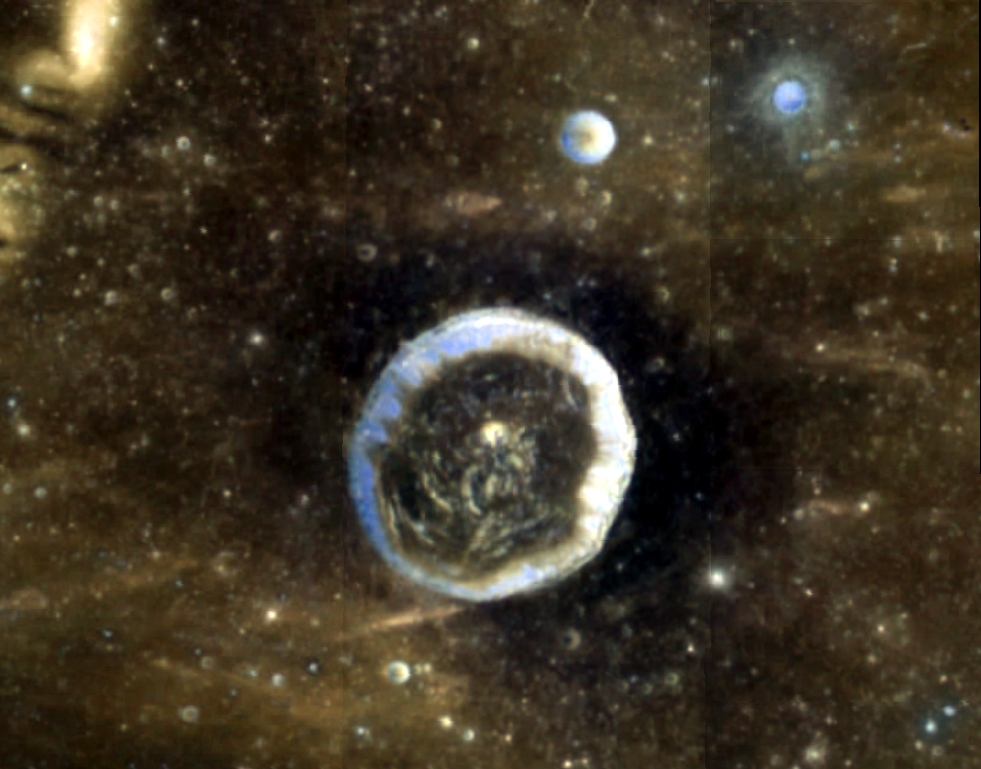
Clementine image

Reiner is a lunar impact crater on the Oceanus Procellarum, in the western part of the Moon. It has a nearly circular rim, but appears oval in shape due to foreshortening. The rim edge is well-defined and has not been eroded by impacts. In the midpoint of the irregular crater floor is a central peak. Outside the rim is a hummocky rampart that extends out across the mare for about half a crater diameter.

To the west-northwest of the crater on the Oceanus Procellarum is the unusual feature Reiner Gamma, a fish-shaped surface marking of ray-like material with a high albedo.

Reiner is a crater of Eratosthenian age. It is named after the astronomer Vincentio Reinieri, a disciple of Galileo Galilei.

== Satellite craters ==
By convention these features are identified on lunar maps by placing the letter on the side of the crater midpoint that is closest to Reiner.

Reiner	Latitude	Longitude	Diameter
A	5.2° N	51.4° W	10 km
C	3.5° N	51.5° W	7 km
E	1.9° N	49.6° W	4 km
G	3.3° N	54.3° W	3 km
H	9.1° N	54.7° W	8 km
K	8.1° N	53.9° W	3 km
L	8.0° N	54.6° W	6 km
M	8.6° N	56.1° W	3 km
N	5.4° N	57.5° W	4 km
Q	1.4° N	50.9° W	3 km
R	3.7° N	55.5° W	45 km
S	2.2° N	50.7° W	4 km
T	3.7° N	52.2° W	2 km
U	4.1° N	52.5° W	3 km
