= Vincentio Bastini =

Vincentio Bastini (c.1529 – 1591), also known as Vincenzo di Pasquino Bastini, was an Italian cornettist and composer who lived his entire life in Lucca. On 27 December 1543, he was hired by the city of Lucca as a cornettist. He was paid a monthly salary of three scudi, which was considerably less than the salaries of the city's four other cornet players. His low salary was probably due to his young age and the tendency of the government to pay more for musicians who hailed from outside of Lucca. He published two books of madrigals: the 1567 Primo libro de madrigali a cinque et a sei voci contained 29 pieces; the 1578 Secondo libro de madrigali a cinque et a sei voci contained 34.

== Bibliography ==
- Myers, Patricia Ann. "Bastini, Vincentio". Grove Music Online (subscription required). ed. L. Macy. Retrieved on March 5, 2007.
