= Vincentio Reinieri =

Italian mathematician and astronomer

- Born: 30 March 1606; Genoa, Republic of Genoa
- Died: 5 November 1642 (aged 36)
- Scientific career
- Fields: Mathematics; Astronomy

Vincentio (Vincenzio, Vincenzo) Reinieri (Renieri, Reiner) (30 March 1606 – 5 November 1647) was an Italian mathematician and astronomer. He was a friend and disciple of Galileo Galilei.

== Biography ==
Born at Genoa, he was a member of the Olivetan order. His order sent him to Rome in 1623. He met Galileo at Siena in 1633. Galileo had Reinieri update and attempt to improve his astronomical tables of the motions of Jupiter's moons, revising these tables for prediction of the positions of these satellites.

Reinieri's work led him to Arcetri, where he befriended Vincenzo Viviani. Reinieri enjoyed the same spirit of inquiry and love of debate as his mentor. On 5 February 1641 Reinieri wrote to Galileo from Pisa: "Not infrequently I am in some battle with the Peripatetic gentlemen, particularly when I note that those fattest with ignorance least appreciate your worth, and I have just given the head of one of those a good scrubbing." (Drake, p. 413-4)

Reinieri became professor of mathematics at the University of Pisa on the death of Dino Peri. He also taught Greek there. His astronomical work consisted of adding new observations of Jupiter's moons to Galileo's. To some degree, Reinieri improved the Galilean tables on the motions of these satellites. Before his death, Galileo decided to place all of the papers containing his observations and calculations in the hands of Reinieri. Reinieri was to finish and revise them.

Reinieri's observations of Jupiter's moons remained unpublished at the time of his premature death at Pisa in 1647. He was succeeded to the chair of mathematics by Famiano Michelini (c. 1600-1666).

== Legacy ==
On Reinieri's death, papers concerning longitude entrusted to him by Galileo are said to have been stolen by a man named Giuseppe Agostini (Fahie, p. 374). However, scholars such as Antonio Favaro doubt whether this theft actually occurred (see Antonio Favaro, Documenti inediti per la Storia dei MSS. Galileiani, Rome, 1886, pp. 8–14).

The crater Reiner on the Moon is named after him.

== Latin works ==
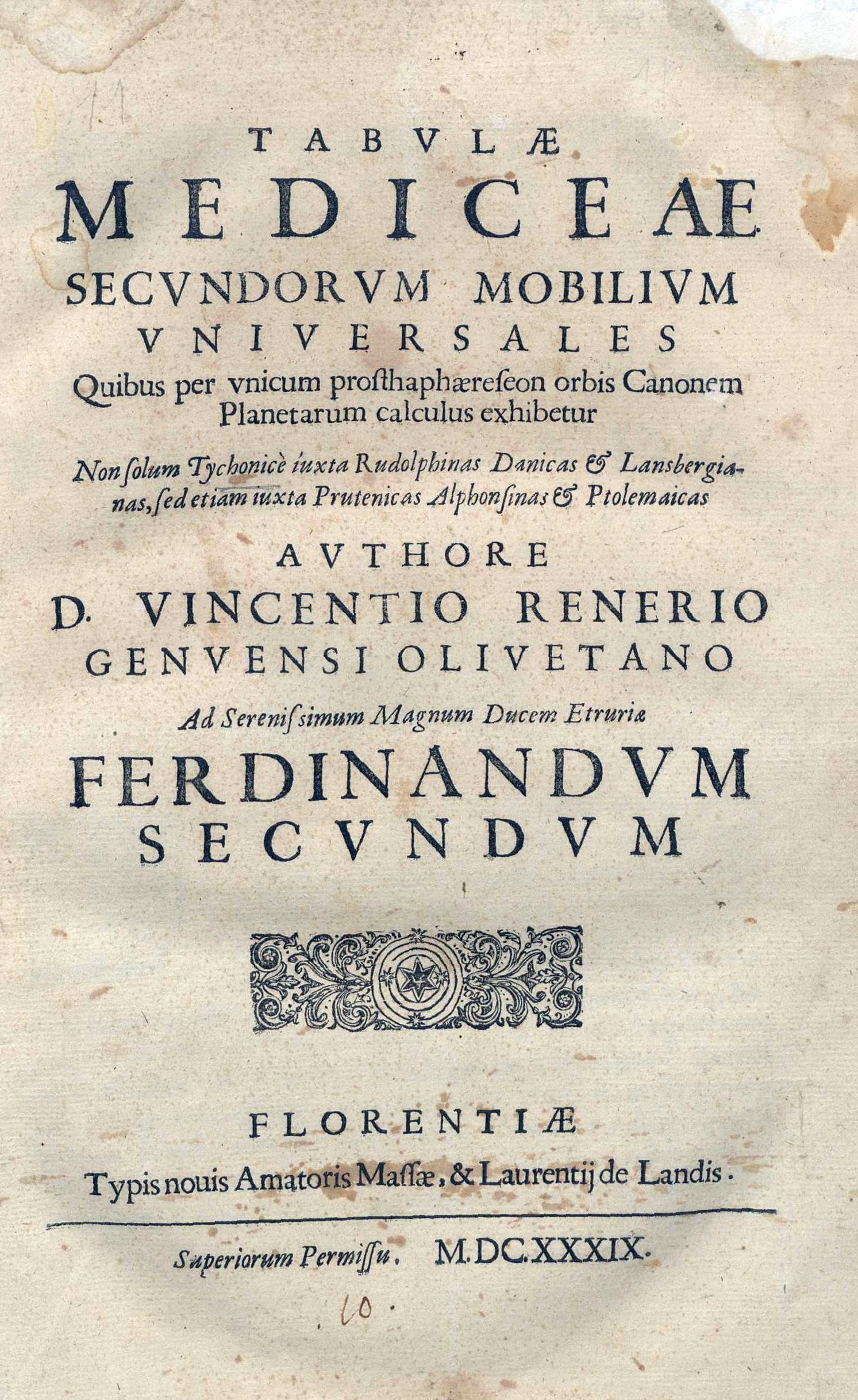
Tabulae Mediceae secundorum mobilium uniuersales, 1639

- Expugnata Hierusalem, poema, Publisher: Maceratae, Apud Petrum Salvionum (1628)
- Tabulae mediceae secundorum mobilium universales quibus per unicum prosthaphaereseon orbis canonem planetarum calculus exhibetur. Non solum tychonicè iuxta Rudolphinas Danicas & Lansbergianas, sed etiam iuxta Prutenicas Alphonsinas & Ptolemaicas, Publisher: Florentiae, typis nouis Amatoris Massae & Laurentij de Landis (1639)
- Tabulae Mediceae secundorum mobilium uniuersales (in Latin). Firenze: Amadore Massi & Lorenzo Landi. 1639.
- Tabulæ motuum cælestium universales : serenissimi magni ducis etruriæ Ferdinandi II. auspicijs primo editæ, & Mediceæ nuncupati, nunc vero auctæ, recognitæ, atque... Bernardini Fernandez de Velasco... iussu, ac sumptibus recusæ...Publisher: Florentiæ : typis Amatoris Massæ Foroliuien., 1647

== Sources ==
- Drake, Stillman, Galileo at Work: His Scientific Biography (Chicago: University of Chicago Press, 1978), 464. ISBN 0-226-16226-5
- Fahie, J.J., Galileo: His Life and Work (London: John Murray, 1903), 374-5. - Google Books
