= Iron snow =

Iron snow is crystallized particles of iron which are believed to precipitate through the outer core of some terrestrial planets and moons as that core slowly cools, much like snowflakes do on Earth. These iron crystals are more dense than the surrounding liquid, and fall towards the planet's inner core where they remelt under pressure and combine with other elements. Here, the melting point of the iron is reduced by the presence of sulfur, and the newly mixed sulfur and iron compounds begin to float back up towards the outer core.

Iron and sulfur, which do not precipitate out, will tend to be lighter than the surrounding material and are believed to collect into a solid layer at the core/mantle boundary, sometimes referred to as an anticrust.

This movement of iron may account for the magnetic fields present on the planet Mercury and the Jupiter moon Ganymede.
