= Crustal magnetism =

Magnetic field of the crust of a planetary body

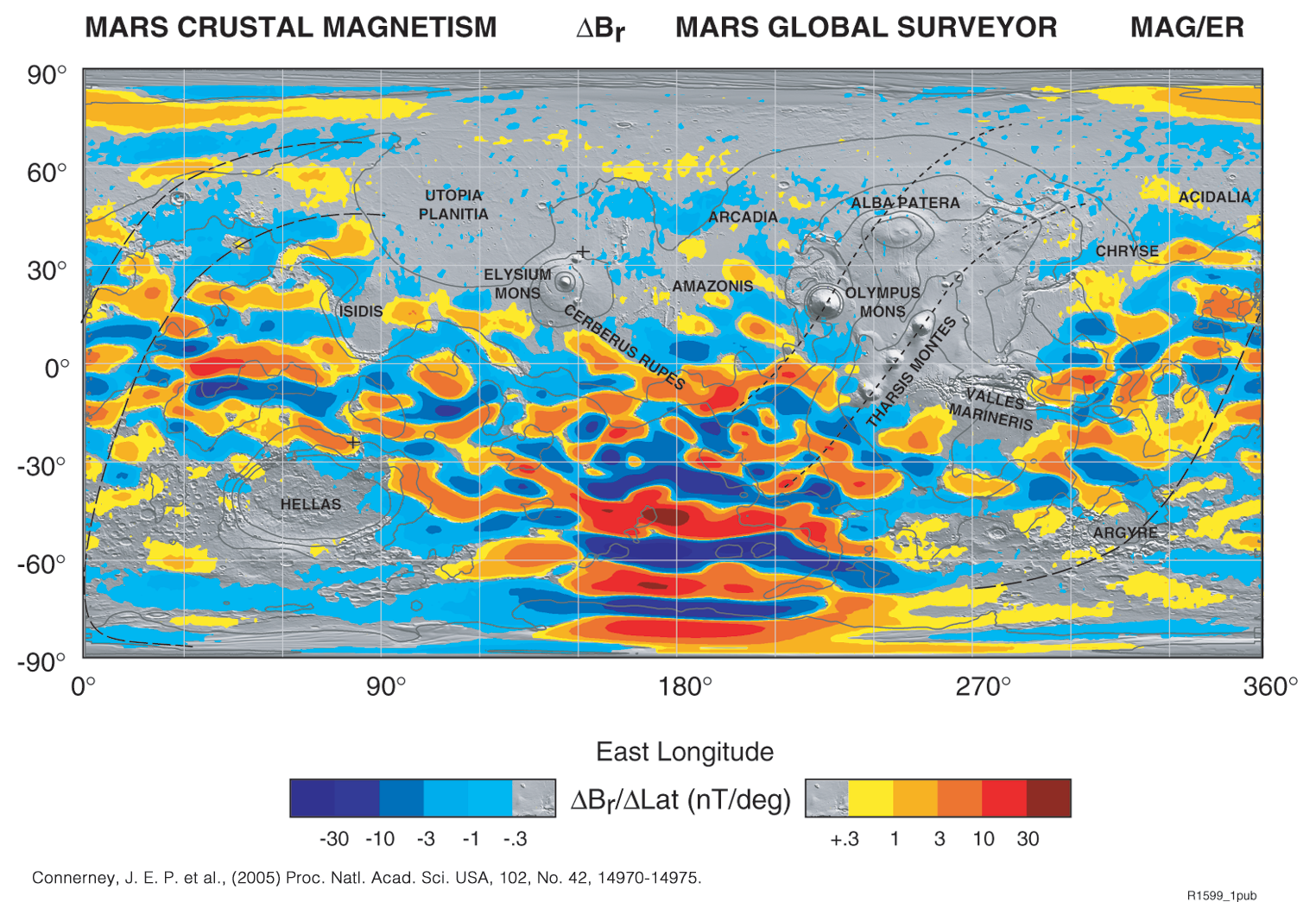
Crustal magnetism map of Mars

Crustal magnetism is the magnetic field of the crust of a planetary body. The crustal magnetism of Earth has been studied; in particular, various magnetic crustal anomalies have been studied. Two examples of crustal magnetic anomalies on Earth that have been studied in the Americas are the Brunswick magnetic anomaly (BMA) and East Coast magnetic anomaly (ECMA). Also, there can be a correlation between physical geological features and certain readings from crustal magnetism on Earth. Below the surface of the Earth, the crustal magnetism is lost because the temperature rises above the curie temperature of the materials producing the field.

On Mars, the crustal magnetic fields have been noted as affecting its ionosphere. (See also Atmosphere of Mars) The magnetic fields on Mars from its rocks and crust are thought to come from ferromagnetism and if the material is heated above its curie temperature the magnetic imprint is un-done. The Mars Global Surveyor (MGS) discovered magnetic stripes in the crust of Mars, especially in the Phaethontis and Eridania quadrangles (Terra Cimmeria and Terra Sirenum). The magnetometer on MGS discovered 100 km (62 mi) wide stripes of magnetized crust running roughly parallel for up to 2,000 kilometres (1,200 mi). These stripes alternate in polarity, with the north magnetic pole of one pointing up from the surface and the north magnetic pole of the next pointing down. When similar stripes were discovered on Earth in the 1960s, they were taken as evidence of plate tectonics. Researchers believe these magnetic stripes on Mars are evidence for a short, early period of plate tectonic activity. Only roughly half of Mars seems to have a crustal magnetic field; there are several possible explanations for this, such as that an internal dynamo only affected part of the planet, or that a body struck Mars in the past destroying the magnetism.

Lunar crustal magnetism has also been discovered and studied. The Lunar Prospector probe of the 1990s mapped the lunar crustal magnetic field across the whole globe of the Moon for the first time. This allowed the impact on magnetic fields of previously identified impact basins to be studied. The impact basins Orientale and Imbrium had some of the weakest magnetic fields in the survey, and additional study puts constraints on the existence of steady ambient lunar magnetic fields in the Moon's past given the assumptions of the data and collection techniques. Remnant crustal magnetic fields are studied on Moon as in this case, and have also been examined on Earth and on Mars. However, these are the only bodies that have by the early 21st century been studied, though it is predicted other bodies will have this geological feature.

== See also ==
- Magnetic anomaly (geology)
- Rock magnetism
- Paleomagnetism
