= Lunar Laser Ranging experiments =

Measuring the distance between the Earth and the Moon with laser light

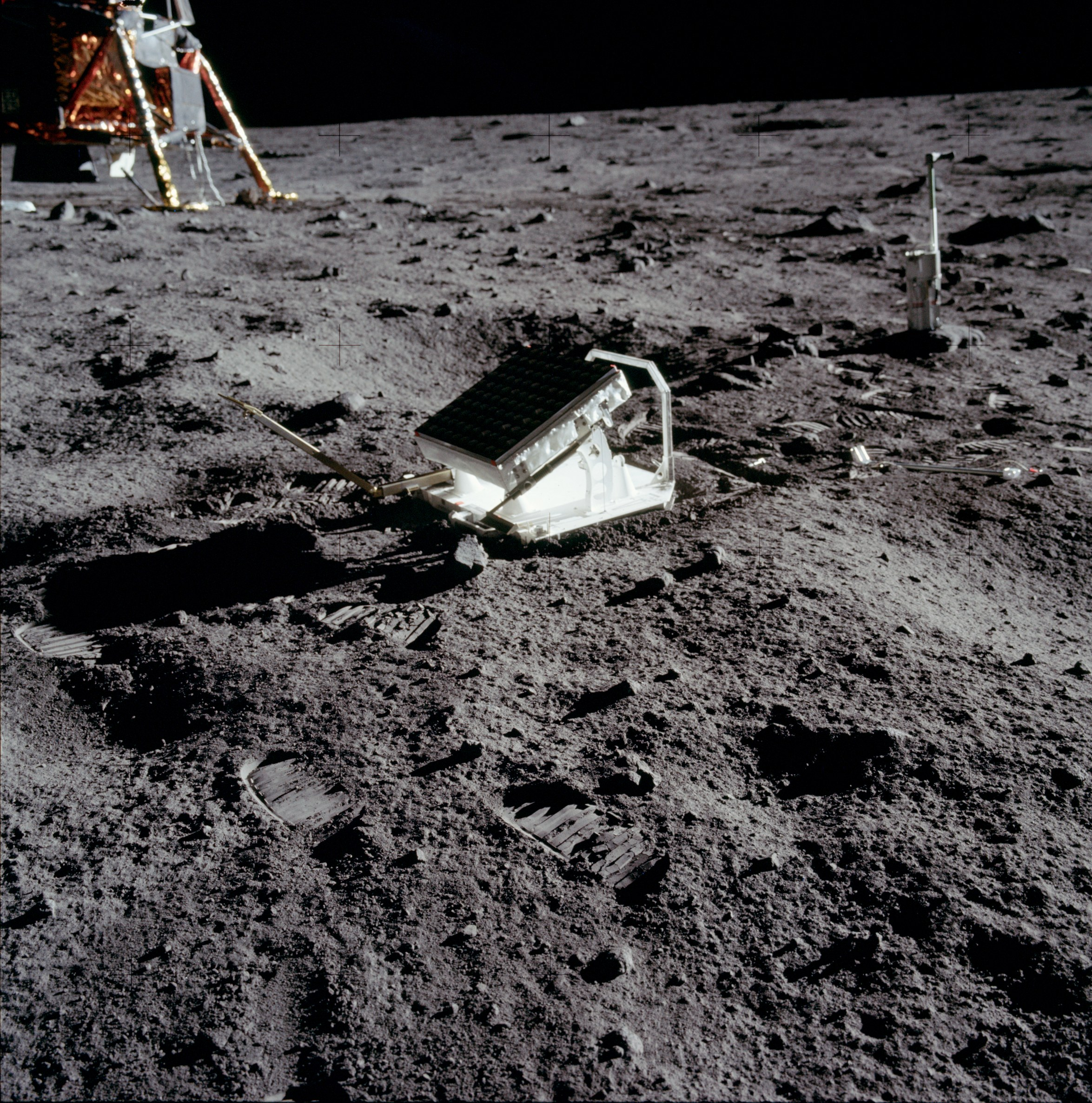
Lunar Laser Ranging Experiment from the 1969 Apollo 11 mission

Lunar Laser Ranging (LLR) is the practice of measuring the distance between the surfaces of the Earth and the Moon using laser ranging. The distance can be calculated from the round-trip time of laser light pulses, travelling at the speed of light, which are reflected back to Earth by the Moon's surface or by one of several retroreflectors installed on the Moon. Three were placed by the United States' Apollo program (11, 14, and 15), two by the Soviet Lunokhod 1 and 2 missions, and one by India's Chandrayaan-3 mission.

Although it is possible to reflect light or radio waves directly from the Moon's surface (a process known as EME), a much more precise range measurement can be made using retroreflectors, since because of their small size, the temporal spread in the reflected signal is much smaller and because the return will be more evenly reflected with less diffusion.

Laser ranging measurements can also be made with retroreflectors installed on Moon-orbiting satellites such as the LRO.

== History ==
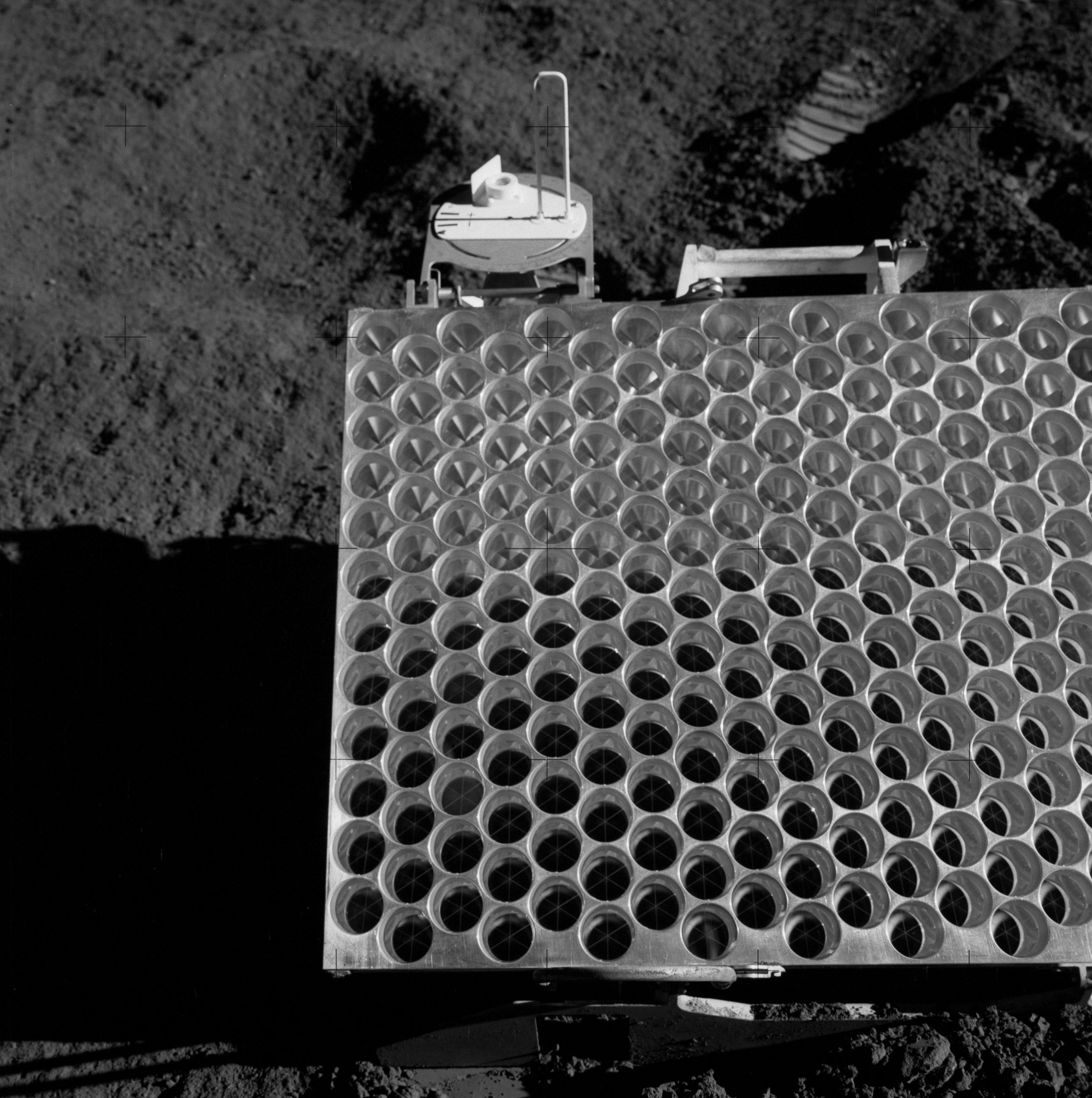
Apollo 15 lunar laser ranging retroreflector

Apollo 15 lunar laser ranging retroreflector schematic

The first successful lunar ranging tests were carried out in 1962 when Louis Smullin and Giorgio Fiocco from the Massachusetts Institute of Technology succeeded in observing laser pulses reflected from the Moon's surface using a laser with a 50J 0.5 millisecond pulse length. Similar measurements were obtained later the same year by a Soviet team at the Crimean Astrophysical Observatory using a Q-switched ruby laser.

Shortly thereafter, Princeton University graduate student James Faller proposed placing optical reflectors on the Moon to improve the accuracy of the measurements. This was achieved following the installation of a retroreflector array on July 21, 1969 by the crew of Apollo 11. Two more retroreflector arrays were left by the Apollo 14 and Apollo 15 missions. Successful lunar laser range measurements to the retroreflectors were first reported on Aug. 1, 1969 by the 3.1 m (10 ft) telescope at Lick Observatory. Observations from Air Force Cambridge Research Laboratories Lunar Ranging Observatory in Arizona, the Pic du Midi Observatory in France, the Tokyo Astronomical Observatory, and McDonald Observatory in Texas soon followed.

The uncrewed Soviet Lunokhod 1 and Lunokhod 2 rovers carried smaller arrays. Reflected signals were initially received from Lunokhod 1 by the Soviet Union up to 1974, but not by western observatories that did not have precise information about location. In 2010 NASA's Lunar Reconnaissance Orbiter located the Lunokhod 1 rover on images and in April 2010 a team from University of California ranged the array. Lunokhod 2's array continues to return signals to Earth. The Lunokhod arrays suffer from decreased performance in direct sunlight –a factor considered in reflector placement during the Apollo missions.

The Apollo 15 array is three times the size of the arrays left by the two earlier Apollo missions. Its size made it the target of three-quarters of the sample measurements taken in the first 25 years of the experiment. Improvements in technology since then have resulted in greater use of the smaller arrays, by sites such as the Côte d'Azur Observatory in Nice, France; and the Apache Point Observatory Lunar Laser-ranging Operation (APOLLO) at the Apache Point Observatory in New Mexico.

In the 2010s several new retroreflectors were planned. The MoonLIGHT reflector, which was to be placed by the private MX-1E lander, was designed to increase measurement accuracy up to 100 times over existing systems. MX-1E was set to launch in July 2020; however, as of February 2020, the launch of the MX-1E has been canceled. India's Chandrayaan-3 lunar lander successfully placed a sixth reflector on the Moon in August 2023.

== Principle ==
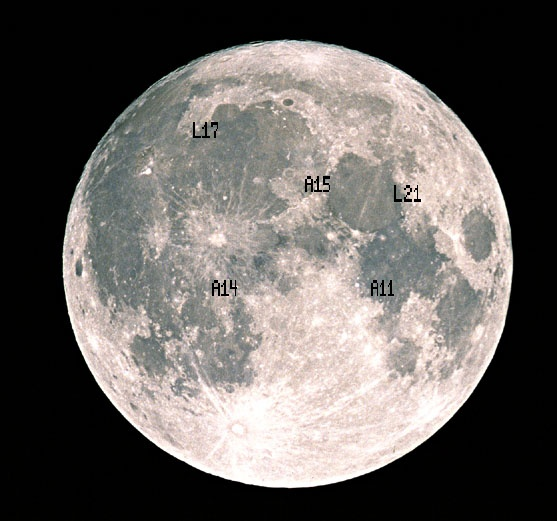
Annotated image of the near side of the Moon showing the location of retroreflectors left on the surface by Apollo and Lunokhod missions

The distance to the Moon is calculated approximately using the equation: distance = (speed of light × duration of delay due to reflection) / 2. Since the speed of light is a defined constant, conversion between distance and time of flight can be made without ambiguity.

To compute the lunar distance precisely, many factors must be considered in addition to the round-trip time of about 2.5 seconds. These factors include the location of the Moon in the sky, the relative motion of Earth and the Moon, Earth's rotation, lunar libration, polar motion, weather, speed of light through various layers of the Earth atmosphere, the location of the observing station and its motion due to crustal motion and tides, and relativistic effects. The distance continually changes for a number of reasons, but averages 385,000.6 km (239,228.3 mi) between the center of the Earth and the center of the Moon. The orbits of the Moon and planets are integrated numerically along with the orientation of the Moon called physical libration.

At the Moon's surface, the beam is about 6.5 kilometers (4.0 mi) wide (Note: During the round-trip time, an Earth observer will have moved by around 1 km (depending on their latitude). This has been presented, incorrectly, as a 'disproof' of the ranging experiment, the claim being that the beam to such a small reflector cannot hit such a moving target. However the size of the beam is far larger than any movement, especially for the returned beam.) and scientists liken the task of aiming the beam to using a rifle to hit a moving dime 3 kilometers (1.9 mi) away. The reflected light is too weak to see with the human eye. Out of a pulse of 3×10^{17} photons aimed at the reflector, only about 1–5 are received back on Earth, even under good conditions. They can be identified as originating from the laser because the laser is highly monochromatic.

As of 2009, the distance to the Moon can be measured with millimeter precision. In a relative sense, this is one of the most precise distance measurements ever made, and is equivalent in accuracy to determining the distance between Los Angeles and New York to within the width of a human hair.

== List of observatories ==
The table below presents a list of active and inactive Lunar Laser Ranging stations on Earth.

Lunar Laser Ranging stations
Observatory	Project	Operating timespan	Telescope	Laser	Range accuracy	Ref.
McDonald Observatory, Texas, US	MLRS	1969–1985 1985–2013	2.7 m	694 nm, 7 J 532 nm, 200 ps, 150 mJ		
Crimean Astrophysical Observatory (CrAO), USSR		1974, 1982–1984		694 nm	3.0–0.6 m	
Côte d'Azur Observatory (OCA), Grasse, France	MeO	1984–1986 1986–2010 2010–present (2021)		694 nm 532 nm, 70 ps, 75 mJ 532/1064 nm		
Haleakala Observatory, Hawaii, US	LURE	1984–1990		532 nm, 200 ps, 140 mJ	2.0 cm	
Matera Laser Ranging Observatory (MLRO), Italy		2003–present (2021)		532 nm		
Apache Point Observatory, New Mexico, US	APOLLO	2006–2021 2021–present (2023)		532 nm, 100 ps, 115 mJ	1.1 mm	
Geodetic Observatory Wettzell, Germany	WLRS	2018–present (2021)		1064 nm, 10 ps, 75 mJ		
Yunnan Astronomical Observatory, Kunming, China		2018	1.2 m	532 nm, 10 ns, 3 J	meter level	

== Data analysis ==
The Lunar Laser Ranging data is collected in order to extract numerical values for a number of parameters. Analyzing the range data involves dynamics, terrestrial geophysics, and lunar geophysics. The modeling problem involves two aspects: an accurate computation of the lunar orbit and lunar orientation, and an accurate model for the time of flight from an observing station to a retroreflector and back to the station. Modern Lunar Laser Ranging data can be fit with a 1 cm weighted rms residual.

- The center of Earth to center of Moon distance is computed by a program that numerically integrates the lunar and planetary orbits accounting for the gravitational attraction of the Sun, planets, and a selection of asteroids.
- The same program integrates the 3-axis orientation of the Moon called physical Libration.

The range model includes

- The position of the ranging station accounting for motion due to plate tectonics, Earth rotation, precession, nutation, and polar motion.
- Tides in the solid Earth and seasonal motion of the solid Earth with respect to its center of mass.
- Relativistic transformation of time and space coordinates from a frame moving with the station to a frame fixed with respect to the solar system center of mass. Lorentz contraction of the Earth is part of this transformation.
- Delay in the Earth's atmosphere.
- Relativistic delay due to the gravity fields of the Sun, Earth, and Moon.
- The position of the retroreflector accounting for orientation of the Moon and solid-body tides.
- Lorentz contraction of the Moon.
- Thermal expansion and contraction of the retroreflector mounts.

For the terrestrial model, the IERS Conventions (2010) is a source of detailed information.

== Results ==
Lunar laser ranging measurement data is available from the Paris Observatory Lunar Analysis Center, the International Laser Ranging Service archives, and the active stations. Some of the findings of this long-term experiment are:

=== Properties of the Moon ===
- The distance to the Moon can be measured with millimeter precision.
- The Moon is spiraling away from Earth at a rate of 3.8 cm/year. This rate has been described as anomalously high.
- The fluid core of the Moon was detected from the effects of core/mantle boundary dissipation.
- The Moon has free physical librations that require one or more stimulating mechanisms.
- Tidal dissipation in the Moon depends on tidal frequency.
- The Moon probably has a liquid core of about 20% of the Moon's radius. The radius of the lunar core-mantle boundary is determined as 381±12 km.
- The polar flattening of the lunar core-mantle boundary is determined as (2.2±0.6)×10^{−4}.
- The free core nutation of the Moon is determined as 367±100 yr.
- Accurate locations for retroreflectors serve as reference points visible to orbiting spacecraft.

=== Gravitational physics ===
- Einstein's theory of gravity (the general theory of relativity) predicts the Moon's orbit to within the accuracy of the laser ranging measurements.
- Gauge freedom plays a major role in a correct physical interpretation of the relativistic effects in the Earth-Moon system observed with LLR technique.
- The likelihood of any Nordtvedt effect (a hypothetical differential acceleration of the Moon and Earth towards the Sun caused by their different degrees of compactness) has been ruled out to high precision, strongly supporting the strong equivalence principle.
- The universal force of gravity is very stable. The experiments have constrained the change in Newton's gravitational constant G to a factor of (2±7)×10^{−13} per year.

== Gallery ==
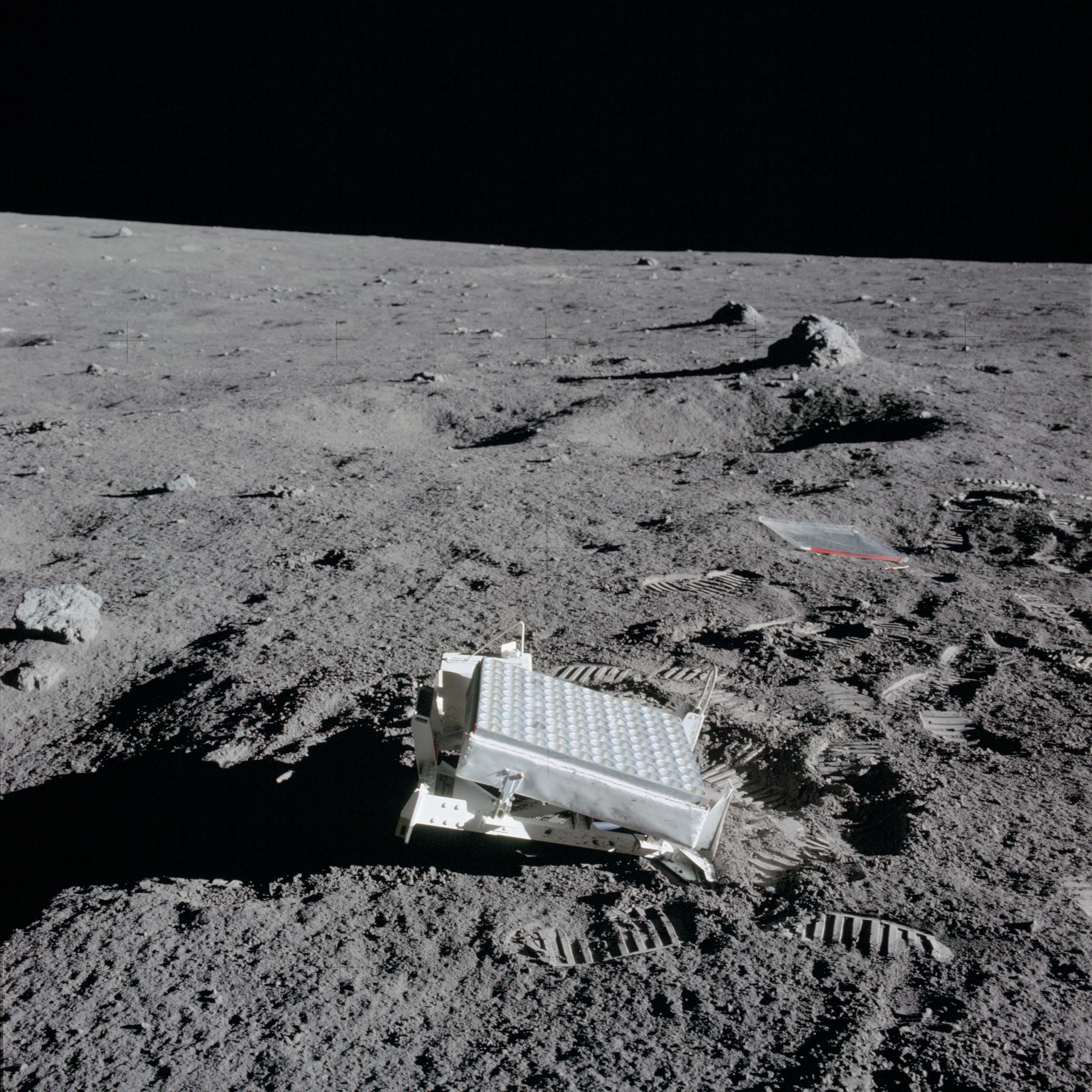
Apollo 14 lunar laser ranging retroreflector (LRRR)

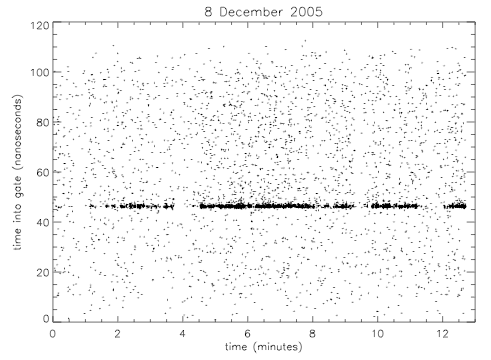
APOLLO collaboration photon pulse return times

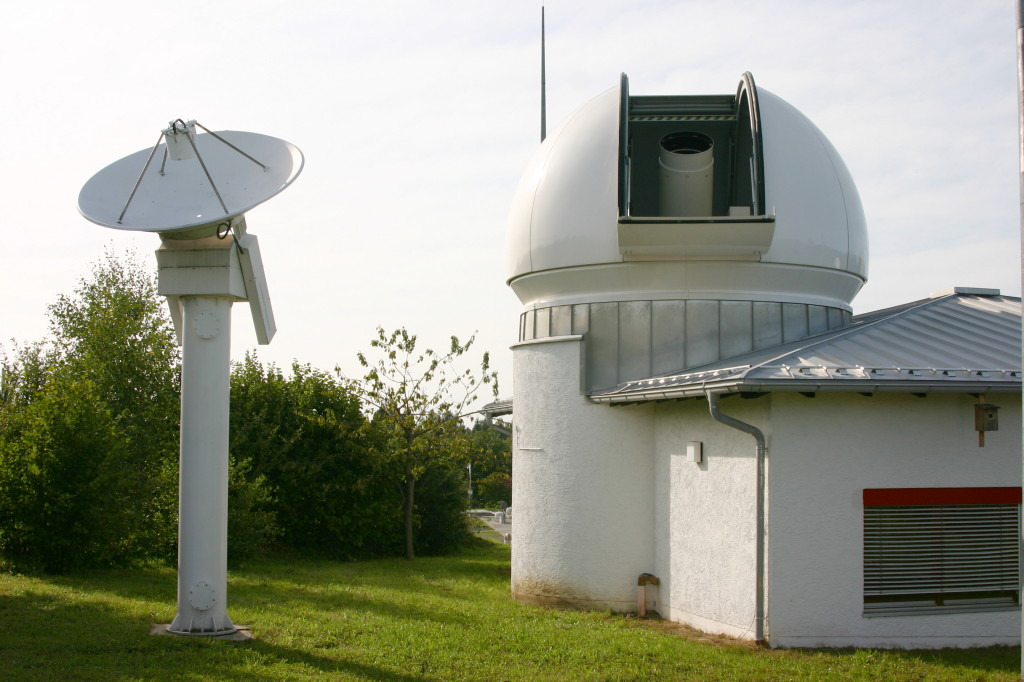
Laser ranging facility at Wettzell fundamental station, Bavaria, Germany

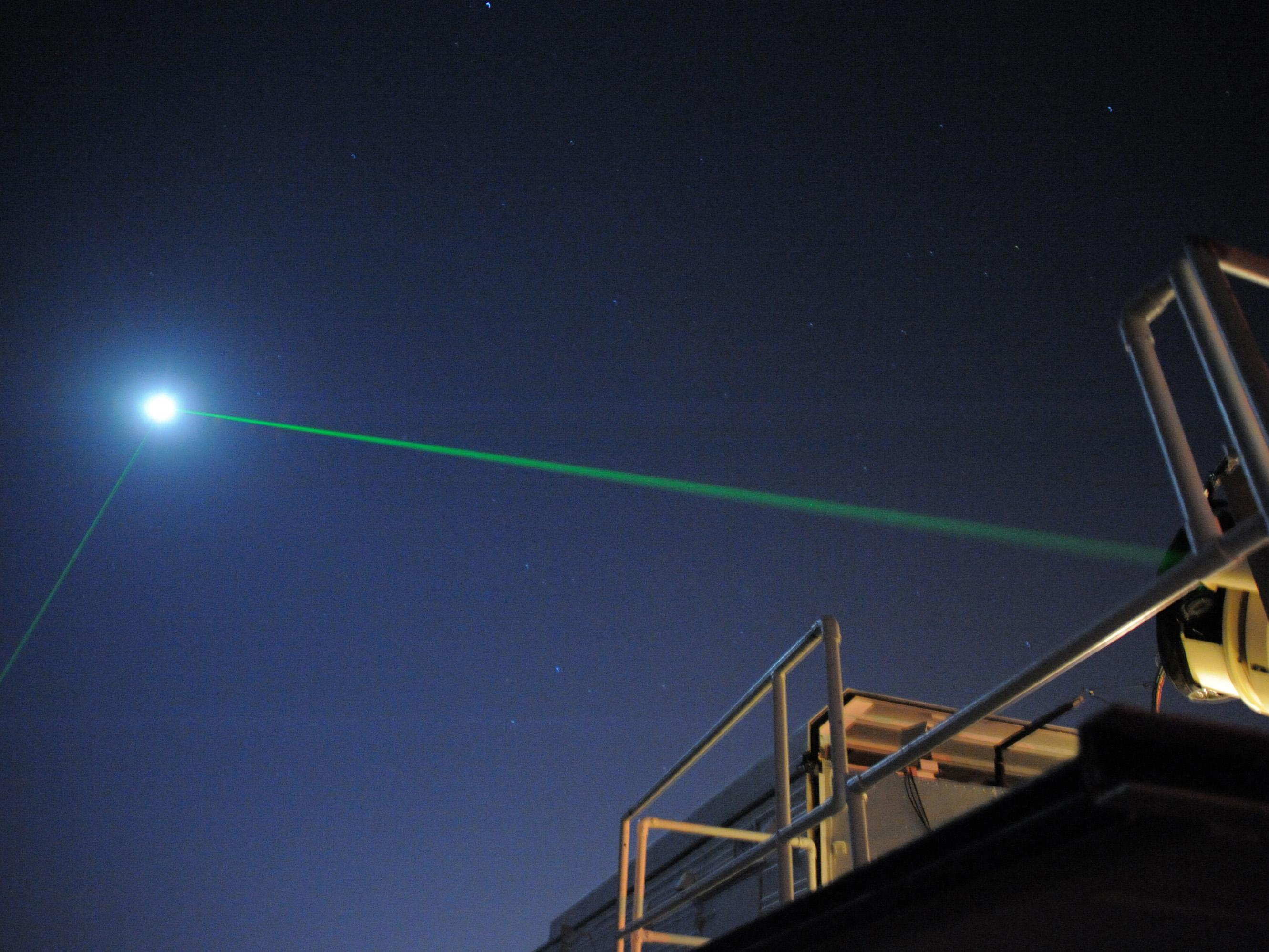
Laser ranging at Goddard Space Flight Center

== See also ==
- Carroll Alley (first principal investigator of the Apollo Lunar Laser Ranging team)
- Lidar
- Lunar distance (astronomy)
- Satellite laser ranging
- Space geodesy
- Third-party evidence for Apollo Moon landings
- List of artificial objects on the Moon
