= Laser Ranging Retroreflector =

1969 American experiment on the Moon

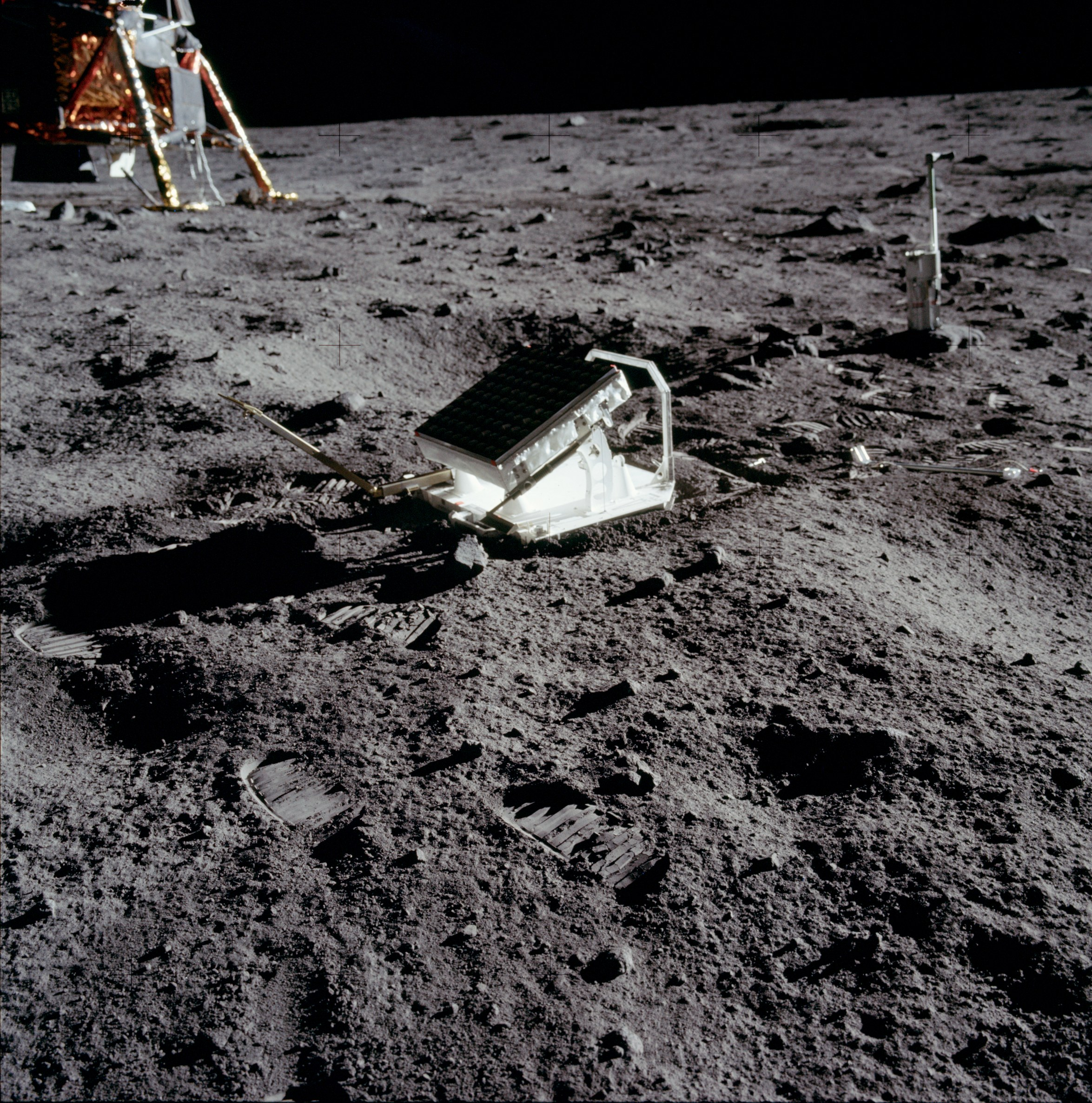
- The Apollo 11 Laser Ranging Retroreflector experiment on the Moon
- Mission duration: Apollo 11: 56 years, 2 months, 9 days Apollo 14: 54 years, 7 months, 30 days Apollo 15: 54 years, 1 month, 30 days

Spacecraft properties
- Manufacturer: Arthur D. Little Inc; PerkinElmer

The Laser Ranging Retroreflector (LRRR) is the first ever deployable lunar laser ranging experiment. It was carried on Apollo 11 as part of the Early Apollo Scientific Experiments Package, and on Apollo 14 and Apollo 15 as part of the Apollo Lunar Surface Experiments Package (ALSEP). The LRRR consists of a series of corner reflectors set within a panel. Laser beams sent from Earth are bounced off the retroreflector and the timing of the return signal can be used to measure the distance from the signal source to the reflector. The reflector was conceived by James E. Faller in 1961. The experiment's principal investigator was initially Carroll Alley of the University of Maryland who was eventually succeeded by Faller.

== Background ==
The motivation for a retroreflector came from a desire for a greater experimental basis for general relativity and specifically problems that arose with the Brans–Dicke theory of gravitation. A research group at Princeton University had been exploring the possibility of testing the gravitational constant by using corner reflectors carried on artificial satellites. At this time lasers had not been developed, and this approach would have required the use of flashtubes. With the development of the first functioning laser in 1960 at Bell Labs, this experiment was no longer restricted to being carried on artificial satellites, but the Moon, Earth's natural satellite, could also be used.

The concept of using a corner reflector on the Moon came in 1961 from James E. Faller, who was a post-graduate doctoral candidate at the time. Conceived with NASA's Surveyor landing program in mind, his idea consisted of a corner reflector mounted within a rubber ball that could be dropped from a robotic lander; upon landing, the ball assembly would self-right and point the reflector upwards. Faller documented these ideas in a note titled "A Proposed Lunar Package (A Corner Reflector on the Moon)", but because he needed to complete his thesis, further development of the concept did not occur immediately.

There were attempts in 1962 at precision ranging of the Moon using lasers without retroreflectors, most notably an attempt in 1962 by Louis Smullin and Giorgio Fiocco from the Massachusetts Institute of Technology. The Moon's surface can scatter a laser beam and produce a sufficiently strong enough signal to be detected on Earth, resulting in ranging measurements that were accurate to within 120 meters (390 ft). Beyond this though the effects of terrain became problematic, and when combined with a returned signal strength that is both weak and temporally dispersed, surface scattering was not sufficient for the purpose of precision ranging.

After an assembly of Princeton staff and alumni at a Physical Society meeting in 1964, it was decided that an experiment based on this concept should be proposed to NASA. Plans for the experiment were laid out in a paper that was published in 1965 and the proposal to NASA was submitted later that year. This was led by Carroll Alley, a professor at the University of Maryland whose proximity to NASA's headquarters made him suited to taking on the role of the experiment's principal investigator. At the same time the Lunar Ranging Experiment (LURE) advisory committee was formed whose notable members included Robert H. Dicke, James E. Faller, David Todd Wilkinson, William M. Kaula, and Gordon J. F. MacDonald.

== Instrument ==
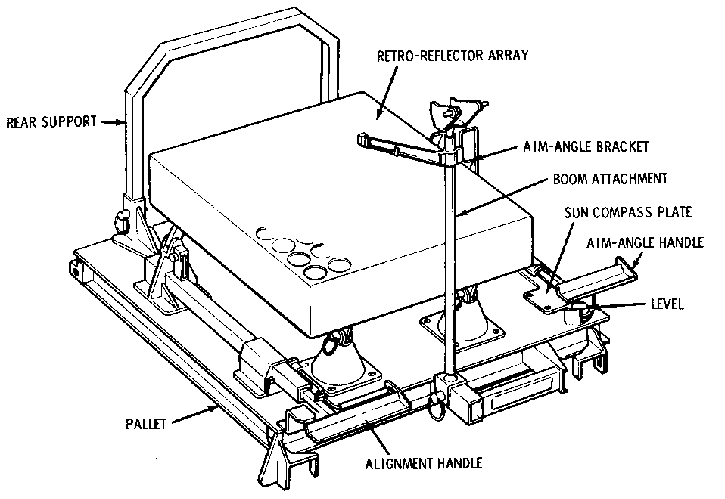
Diagram of the Laser Ranging Retroreflector

The experiment needed to be built to survive the challenging environmental conditions found on the surface of the Moon. This includes large temperature variations, cosmic and solar radiation, and lunar dust kicked up by both the arrival and departure of the Apollo Lunar Module. Faller identified that an array of small-diameter retroreflector cubes would perform better thermally than one or more larger cubes of the same mass. This thermal performance was important because fused silica, the likely material for the reflectors, optically distorts with inputs of heat from solar energy. There was a strong desire for the experiment to be able to operate during the lunar day to avoid the loss of data collection opportunities during the daylight half of each lunar month.

The Apollo 11 and 14 instruments consisted of 100 solid fused-silica corner reflectors set within a 45 cm (18 in) square panel. The corner reflectors were produced by PerkinElmer and Boxton-Beel Inc. Design and fabrication of the array package was completed by Arthur D. Little Inc. Each reflector is 3.8 cm (1.5 in) in diameter sitting 1.9 cm (0.75 in) below the panel's top surface and mounted between Teflon rings for greater thermal protection. The panel could be set at a slight incline so that the panel could present a more optimized cross-sectional area. The reflector enables the return of 10 to 100 times more powerful signal when compared with reflecting off the lunar surface. The expected life of the experiment was in excess of 10 years.

== Missions ==
=== Apollo 11 ===
The Apollo 11 LRRR was deployed on the lunar surface by the Apollo 11 astronaut, Buzz Aldrin, on July 21, 1969. The package was deployed approximately 60 feet (18 m) from Lunar Module Eagle. Aldrin initially aligned the face of the array in an approximate fashion so that it faced the Earth, with more precise alignment provided by a sundial. Deployment of the instrument took around 5 minutes to complete.

Detection of return signals from the lunar surface was done by teams from the University of California, Wesleyan University and Goddard Space Flight Center at the Lick Observatory; and from the University of Texas, University of Mary and Goddard at the McDonald Observatory. The Lick Observatory's 3-meter (9.8 ft) telescope was used for the initial signal detection period immediately after the landing of Apollo 11. The McDonald Observatory's 2.7-meter (8 ft 10 in) telescope was used as part of a long-term observation program over a number of years.

Each site used its own Q-switched ruby laser to provide laser pulses, tens of nanoseconds in length and with energies of approximately 7 joules per pulse. Each telescope was used to reduce the divergence of the laser beam to only 2 arc seconds. This resulted in the laser pulses reaching the Moon with a diameter of 1 mi (1.6 km) rather than a diameter of 300 mi (480 km). The returned signal diameter after a complete trip from the Earth to the Moon was 10 mi (16 km) wide resulting in only 1.6 detectable photoelectrons per laser shot by the telescope.

To avoid risks to the operators of the telescope, an electronic viewing system was used to mitigate the risks posed by backscattered laser light to the human eye. This brought additional benefits such as to increase the perceived contrast which enable the identification of features during local daytime on Earth. Concerns about possible disruption to aircraft arriving at nearby San Francisco Bay Area airports resulted in the Federal Aviation Administration diverting aircraft.

As soon as the instrument was deployed, attempts were made to detect returned signals with no success due to limited observation time and uncertainty in deriving the experiment package's precise location. Strong return signals would not be detected until August 1 by the team at the Lick Observatory achieving a measurement with an accuracy of approximately 7 meters (23 ft) during the first observation. The detection aided other observatories by reducing the uncertainty of the instrument's location. The panel eventually enabled a measurement accuracy of approximately 15 cm (5.9 in). The scientists operating the Lick telescope were puzzled by a persistent drift in the measured signal times versus those that were predicted. The explanation was that the Lick telescope's recorded location on Earth was incorrect by approximately 25 meters (82 ft). Additional detections were made by the McDonald Observatory, Pic du Midi Observatory, the Air Force Cambridge Research Laboratories Lunar Ranging Observatory and the Tokyo Astronomical Observatory.
