= Wettzell =

Wettzell may refer to:

- Wettzell (Bad Kötzting), a district (village) of Bad Kötzting, Germany
- Geodetic Observatory Wettzell, located west of the village Wettzell
- 38270 Wettzell, a minor planet
