= Bepicolombo =

Bepicolombo may refer to:

- BepiColombo, a mission to Mercury launched in October 2018
- 10387 Bepicolombo, an asteroid

== See also ==
- Giuseppe "Bepi" Colombo, an Italian scientist and engineer (1920-1984)
