= Bepi Colombo =

Bepi Colombo may refer to:

- Giuseppe 'Bepi' Colombo (1920–1984), an Italian scientist
- 10387 Bepicolombo, an asteroid named after Bepi Colombo
- BepiColombo, a space mission to Mercury, named after Bepi Colombo
