= Carlo H. Séquin =

American computer scientist

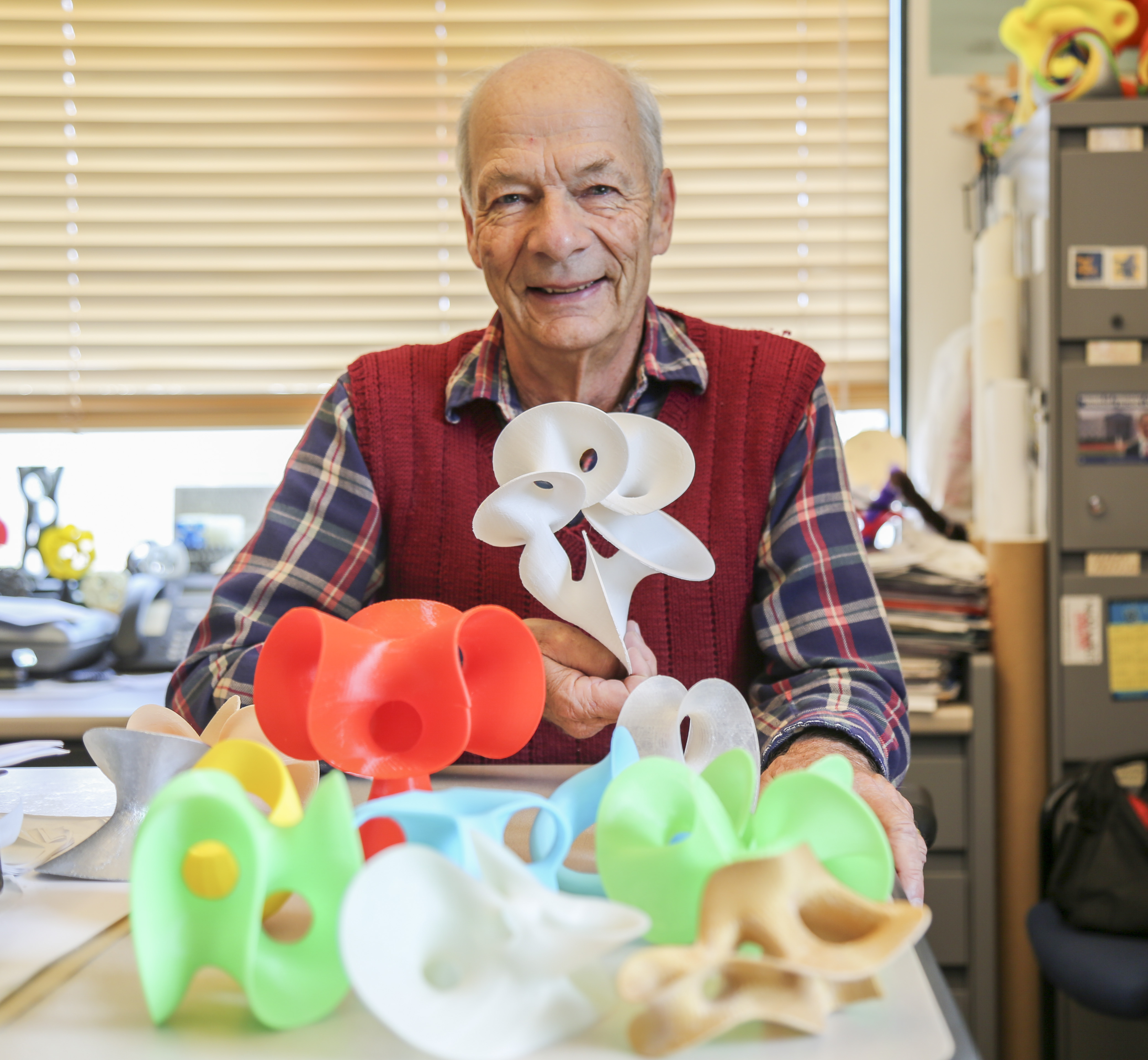
- Born: October 30, 1941 (age 84); Zurich, Switzerland
- Education: Institute of Applied Physics, Basel, Switzerland
- Known for: Computer systems design and architecture
- Scientific career
- Workplaces: University of California, Berkeley
- Doctoral students: Seth Teller

Carlo Heinrich Séquin (born October 30, 1941) is a professor of computer science at the University of California, Berkeley, in the United States.

Séquin is recognized as one of the pioneers in processor design. Séquin has worked with computer graphics, geometric modelling, and on the development of computer-aided design (CAD) tools for circuit designers. He was born in Zurich, Switzerland.

Séquin is a Fellow of the Association for Computing Machinery.

== Academic history ==
Séquin holds the Baccalaureate type C (in Math and Science), Basel, Switzerland (1960), the Diploma in Experimental Physics, University of Basel, Switzerland (1965), and a Ph.D in Experimental Physics, from the Institute of Applied Physics, Basel (1969).

== Career ==
Having received his doctorate, Séquin went on to work at the Institute of Applied Physics in Basel on the interface physics of MOS transistors and problems of applied electronics in the field of cybernetic models. From 1970 to 1976 Séquin worked at Bell Telephone Laboratories in New Jersey on the design and investigation of charge-coupled devices for imaging and signal processing applications. While at Bell Telephone Laboratories he was introduced to computer graphics in lectures given by Ken Knowlton.

In 1977 Séquin joined the Faculty in the Electrical Engineering and Computer Science Department (EECS) at Berkeley where he introduced the concept of RISC processors with David A. Patterson in the early 1980s. He was head of the Computer Science Division from 1980 to 1983. Since then he has worked extensively on computer graphics, geometric modelling, and on the development of computer aided design (CAD) tools for circuit designers, architects, and for mechanical engineers.

Séquin's expertise in computer graphics and geometric design have led to his involvement with sculptors of abstract geometric art, which was inspired by the analytic constructivism of Frank Smullin.

Séquin is a Fellow of the Association for Computing Machinery (ACM), a Fellow of the IEEE, and has been elected to the Swiss Academy of Engineering Sciences. Since 2001 he has been Associate Dean, Capital Projects, at Berkeley’s College of Engineering.
