= Geodetic Observatory Wettzell =

Coordinates: 49°08′38″N 12°52′45″E

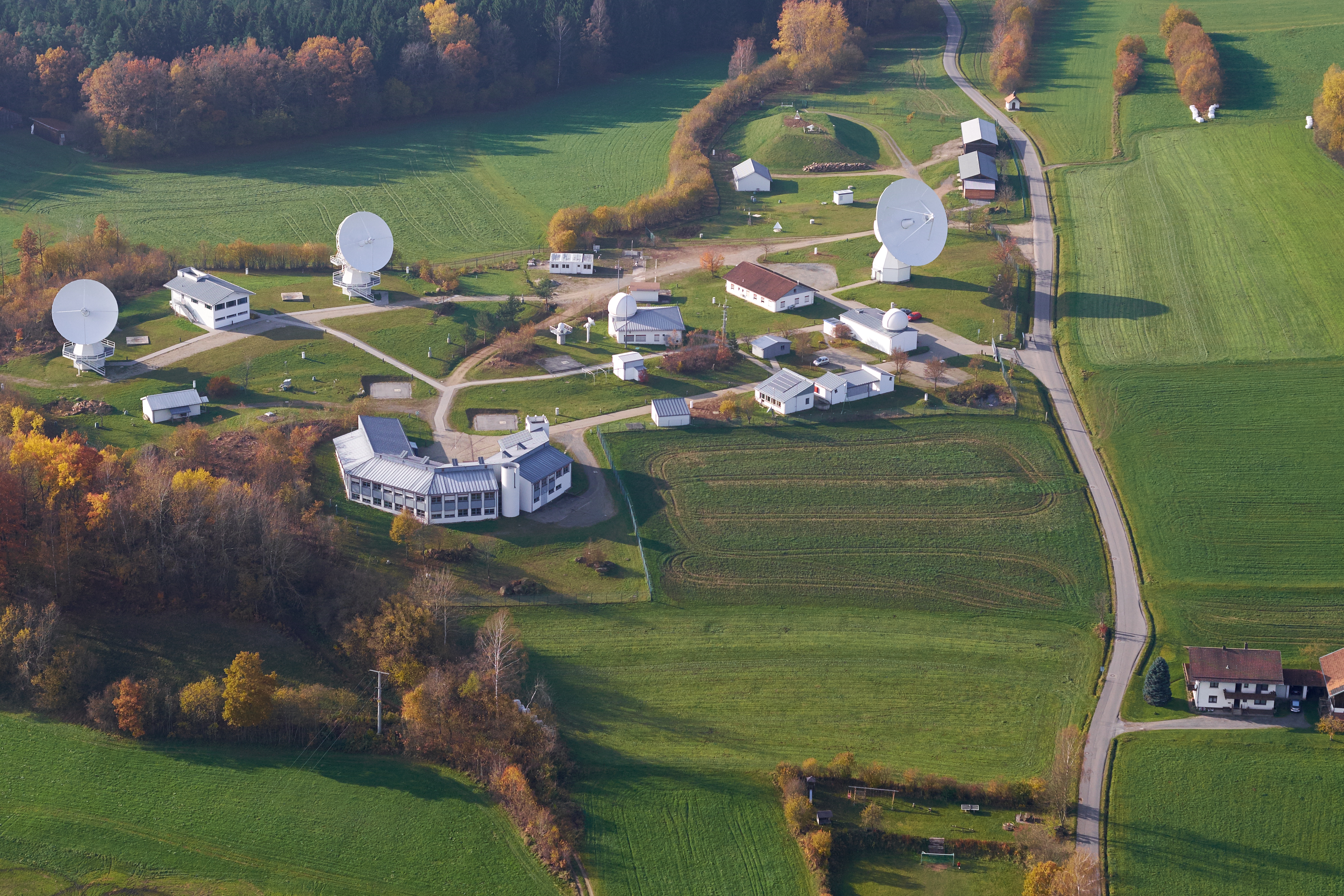
Geodetic Observatory Wettzell, 2014

The Geodetic Observatory Wettzell is located atop the 616 meter-high mountain Wagnerberg, west of the village Wettzell in the German district Cham in the Bavarian Forest.

== Tasks ==
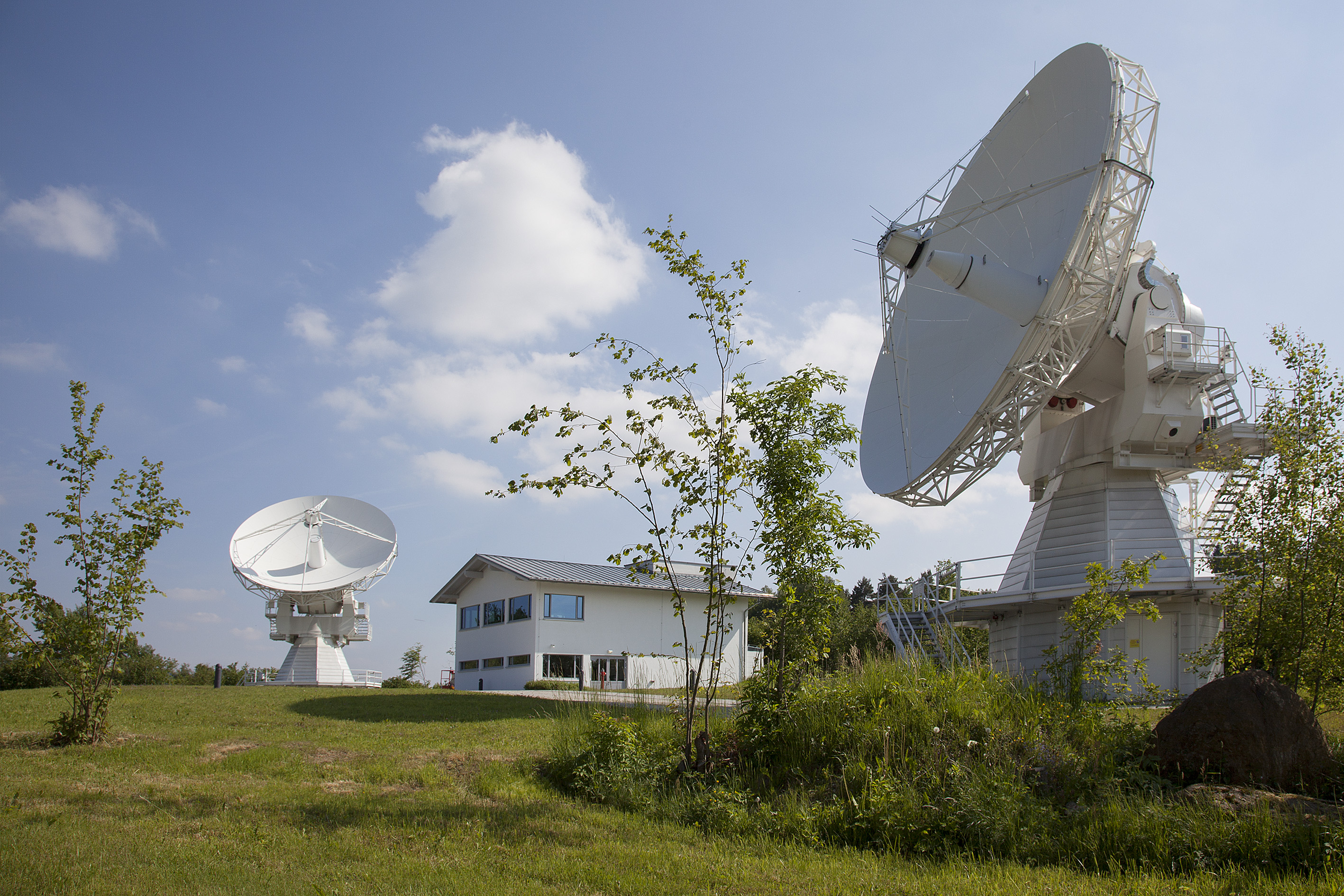
Twin telescopes with operational building, 2015

It is operated for the purpose of geodesy by the Federal Agency for Cartography and Geodesy together with the Technical University of Munich and is today one of the most important geodetic observatories in the world.

As observing station, the Geodetic Observatory Wettzell has the task of gathering measuring data for the geodetic space techniques VLBI, SLR, GNSS and DORIS. These data are used for realizing global coordinate reference systems that form the basis for numerous issues in the field of geosciences (e.g. continental drift, sea level rise), in aerospace, but also in areas of everyday life (e.g. surveying, navigation). These global tasks can today only be solved through international cooperation. The activities like observations, data flow, data analysis and provision of results are coordinated by the international services of the IAG, e.g. IERS, IVS (International VLBI Service), ILRS (International Laser Ranging Service), IGS (International GNSS Service) and IDS (International DORIS Service).

The Federal Georeference Data Act (German: Bundesgeoreferenzdatengesetz) is the legal basis for that.

Wettzell also supports the operation of the observatories AGGO in La Plata/Argentina and GARS O'Higgins in Antarctica.

== Measurement equipment ==
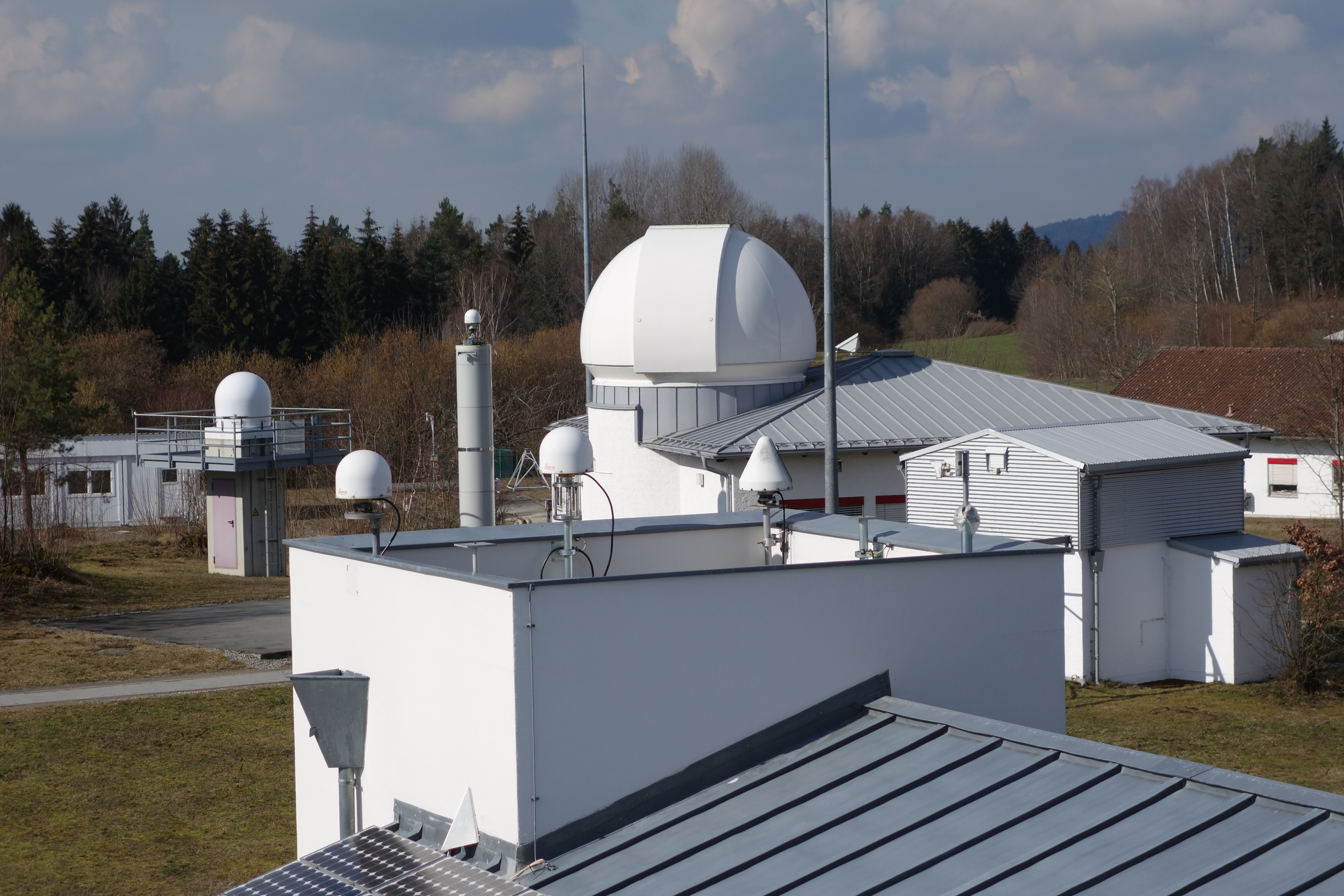
Dome of the laser telescope WLRS with radar tower, multi target and three GNSS antennas, 2016

At the site with an approximate size of 300 by 150 meters, you find all modern observation techniques of satellite or space geodesy and complementary measuring techniques, especially

- a laser telescope for ranging to satellites and the Moon (WLRS)
- a laser telescope for distance measurements to low-flying satellites with high temporal resolution (SOS-W)
- a 20 m radio telescope for intercontinental VLBI measurements (RTW)
- a twin system consisting of two 13 m radio telescopes, also for VLBI measurements (TTW-1 and TTW-2)
- several Multi-GNSS receivers for continuous satellite measurements
- a high-precision time system with several atomic clocks and hydrogen masers and a fibre-optic time distribution system with delay compensation
- a ring laser in an underground observatory for monitoring the Earth's rotation
- a beacon for the French Doppler system DORIS
- a superconducting gravimeter
- complementary measuring equipment for ground and atmosphere monitoring (seismometer, tiltmeter, hydrological sensors, climate station, water vapour radiometer, temperature profiler, cloud detector)
- and facilities for administration and maintenance.

The reference points of the single measuring systems are linked by a local surveying network in order to obtain coordinate differences for a combination of the different techniques. This characteristic determines a geodetic fundamental station.

== History ==
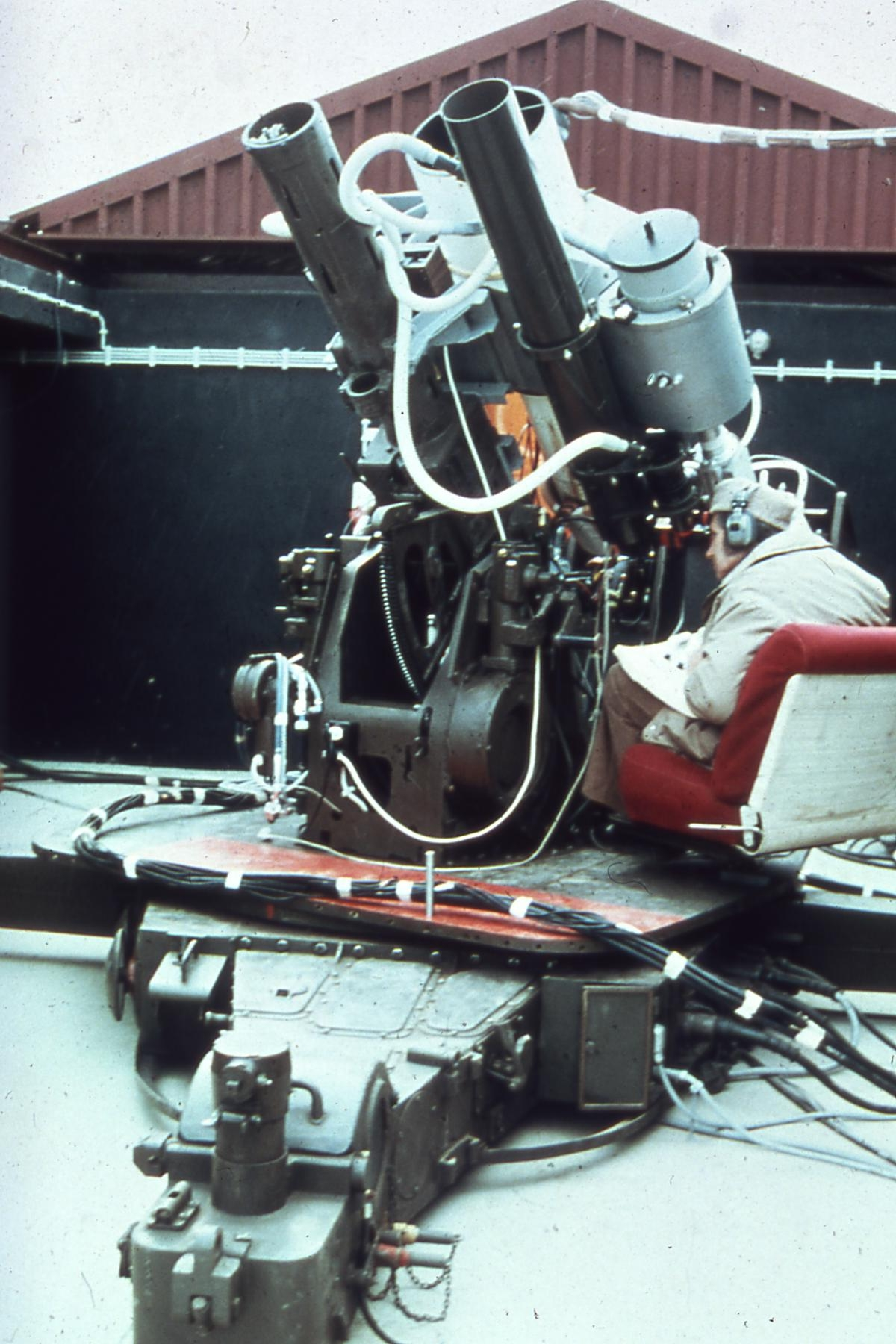
First generation laser ranging system SRS, 1973

The Geodetic Observatory Wettzell was founded nearby the former Iron Curtain to former Czechoslovakia and to Germany's Air Defense Identification Zone in 1970 in order to have a night sky as dark as possible with only low light pollution and have to take little consideration of air traffic for Satellite and Lunar Laser Ranging.

The beginnings of the satellite observing station Wettzell go back to an early research project of the Technical University of Munich and the Institute for Applied Geodesy for optical observation and orbit determination of geodetic Earth satellites. The field of satellite geodesy newly arisen at that time promised great progress for global geodesy. The optical observations carried out until the end of the 1970s included images of satellite passages with the Zeiss Double Astrograph and the ballistic measuring camera Zeiss BMK 75 for satellite triangulation and observations with a circumzenithal and the Danjon Astrolab for astronomical longitude and latitude determination.

In cooperation with the German Test and Research Institute for Aviation and Space Flight (DFVLR, today's DLR), a first laser distance measuring system consisting of an anti-aircraft gun carriage and a ruby laser, was put in operation in 1972. With that, on 8 April 1973, the distance to a satellite (GEOS-1) was measured for the first time in Germany by laser. But only with the following, computer-adjusted systems SRS (Satellite Ranging System, 1977–1991) and WLRS (Wettzell Laser Ranging System, since 1991) large numbers of routine observations became possible. In addition, distances to the reflectors located at the Moon were already measured with the WLRS.

In the mid-seventies, the station was extended by microwave measuring techniques. Since 1974, Doppler measurements to satellites of the “Navy Navigational Satellite System” (N.N.S.S. or Transit) were performed regularly for point determination in geodesy. The first measurements to the satellite navigation system NAVSTAR GPS were already performed during the test phase 1979–1981 with Wettzell as one of four tracking stations worldwide. In 1993 the Doppler measurements ended, after the N.N.S.S. was replaced with the full development of GPS.

With implementing a radio telescope in 1983, the satellite observation station turned into a fundamental station of geodesy, where the various space geodetic techniques VLBI, SLR and GNSS are combined in one place. Since 2012, the observatory has two further so-called twin telescopes, in order to take account of technical progress and the increasing observation tasks.

== See also ==
- List of astronomical observatories
