= Andras Jones =

American actor

Andras Jones (born August 12, 1968 in Santa Cruz, California, U.S.) is an American television and film actor, author, and musician, playing in bands of The Previous and Mr. Jones and The Previous, as well as solo projects. Jones is the creator and host of Radio8Ball, a musical divination show in which participants' questions are answered by picking songs at random and interpreting the randomly chosen songs as the answer to the question. In 1989 Jones was nominated for a Young Artist Award for Best Young Actor in a Horror or Mystery Motion Picture for his role in A Nightmare on Elm Street 4, but lost to Lukas Haas's performance in Lady in White.

Jones is the author of Accidental Initiations: In The Kabbalistic Tree Of Olympia and contributed a chapter to The Sync Book – Volume 1, both for Sync Book Press.

His maternal grandfather was electrical engineer Louis Smullin. His uncle was sculptor Frank Smullin.

== Filmography ==
=== Films ===
- 1988 Sorority Babes in the Slimeball Bowl-O-Rama as Calvin
- 1988 A Nightmare on Elm Street 4: The Dream Master as Rick Johnson
- 1989 Far From Home as Jimmy Reed
- 1990 Tripwire as Rick DeForest
- 1992 The Prom as Marty
- 1992 Averills Ankommon as Averill
- 1994 Every Breath as Good Looking Man
- 1995 The Demolitionist as Daniel Dupre
- 1997 Hurricane Festival as Nick The Magician
- 2001 The Attic Expeditions as Trevor Blackburn
- 2011 Every Day Is a Journey as Anthony "Antonious" Scrotner

=== Television ===
- 1989 Good Morning, Miss Bliss (1 episode) as Deke Simmons
- 1990 Alien Nation (1 episode) as Noah Ramsey

=== Video games ===
- 1992 Night Trap as Jeff Martin

== Discography ==
=== As Andras Jones ===
Albums

- A Curmudgeon For All Seasons (2000)
- All You Get (2019)

EPs

- Cold '98 (1998)
- Religious '99 (2000)
- Complicated '00 (2001)

=== With The Previous ===
Albums

- The Wrong Side Of Town (1989)
- Porch Music (1990)
- UnPop… (1997)

Singles

- "Fast Forvard" (2017)

=== With the Boon ===
- The Boon (1988)

=== Other albums ===
- Mr. Jones & The Hard Feelings (1995)
- As Far As You Can Go Without Leaving (multi-artist compilation album) (1995)
- Mr. Jones & the Fascists: In Search of the Hundredth Monkey (1992)
- The Transfused (2000)
- Andy Shmushkin: Total F**cking Bullsh*t (2003)
- Andy Dick: The Darkest Day of The Year (2009)
