= Space geodesy =

Science of measuring the Earth

Space geodesy is the branch of geodesy that uses observations of objects or signals external to the Earth to measure the Earth's shape, gravity field, rotation, and position in space. Its principal techniques include artificial satellites (in satellite geodesy) but also quasars (in very-long-baseline interferometry, VLBI), visible stars (in stellar triangulation), and the retroreflectors on the Moon (in lunar laser ranging, LLR).

== See also ==
- Astronomical geodesy
