= IM-3 =

Lunar landing mission

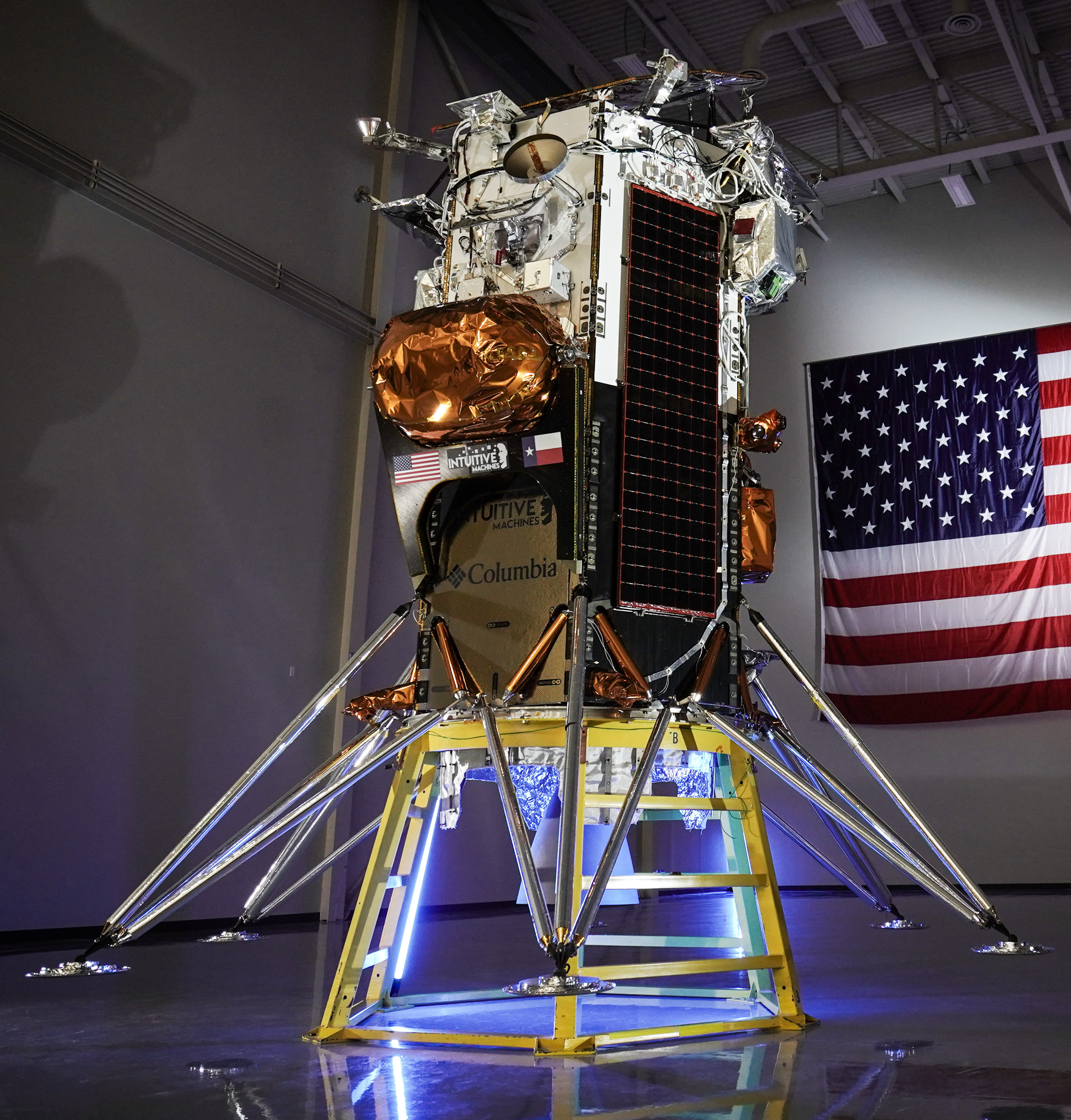
- IM-1 Odysseus, a Nova-C lander similar to IM-3
- Names: IM-3; CLPS CP-11; CP-11; Trinity
- Mission type: Lunar landing
- Operator: Intuitive Machines

Spacecraft properties
- Spacecraft type: Nova-C
- Manufacturer: Intuitive Machines

Start of mission
- Launch date: NET Q1 2027 UTC
- Rocket: Falcon 9 Block 5
- Launch site: Kennedy LC-39A

Lunar lander
- Landing site: Reiner Gamma
- IM-3 mission insignia Motto: MAGNETICAM LUNAM (Magnetic Moon) Intuitive Machines Nova-C Commercial Lunar Payload Services

IM-3 is a robotic lunar lander and lunar satellite mission developed by Intuitive Machines as part of NASA's Commercial Lunar Payload Services (CLPS) program. It is scheduled for launch in early 2027. The Nova-C class lander will deliver payloads to the lunar swirl in the Reiner Gamma region. The lander will investigate the properties of the unexpected magnetic field that has been detected in the vicinity of the Reiner Gamma swirl. The spacecraft will also deploy a communications satellite in lunar orbit to serve as the first relay in the LunaNet project.

== Overview ==
IM-3, which has been given the name 'Trinity', is planned to launch in the first quarter of 2027 on a Falcon 9 launch vehicle at Kennedy Space Center. The mission is focused on the study of Lunar swirls, and supporting future crewed missions in the Artemis program. The mission will deploy a Nova-C class lander to the Reiner Gamma region, and a satellite in lunar orbit which will be the first of the LunaNet project, providing communication relays in the Artemis missions.

IM-1 and IM-2 missions both resulted in partial failures due to the lander tipping over after a hard landing. To mitigate the risk of this, IM-3 is equipped with multiple redundant laser rangefinders and a more extensive crater map computer library.

The spacecraft carries at least 92 kg (203 lb) of science payloads provided by NASA, various private organizations and universities, ESA, ASA, and KASI.

== Payloads ==
=== Lunar Vertex ===
The Applied Physics Laboratory (APL)'s Lunar Vertex payload will conduct a detailed scientific analysis of the surface and surface environment of the Reiner Gamma lunar swirl. It includes payload elements on the Nova-C lander (APL magnetometer, SwRI plasma spectrometer, and Redwire camera arrays) and on a Lunar Outpost rover (APL magnetometer and Canadensys microscopic imager). The rover carrying a multispectral microscope will determine coarseness and brightness of surface particles and transmit its data to the lander. APL provides overall management, systems engineer, SMA, and rover integration and testing. David Blewett (APL) is the principal investigator and leads the science team.

Reiner Gamma

CADRE rovers in JPL clean room

=== Other surface payloads ===
In addition to Lunar Vertex, IM-3 payloads include:

- Cooperative Autonomous Distributed Robotic Explorers (CADRE) rovers
- ESA's MoonLIGHT Pointing Actuator (MPAc)
- KASI's Lunar Space Environment Monitor (LUSEM)
- Australian Lunar Experiment Promoting Horticulture (ALEPH-1) payload for testing plant growth and survival in the lunar environment, by ASA-funded organisation Lunaria One

=== Altus-1 ===
The mission will carry a dedicated communications satellite into lunar orbit. This spacecraft, named Altus-1, is the first of five planned satellites forming the Lunar Data Network (LDN) funded by NASA's Near Space Network Services contract.

=== DeepSpace-2 ===
The asteroid mission DeepSpace-2 by AstroForge will be launched together with IM-3.

== History ==
In August 2021, Intuitive Machines selected SpaceX to launch its third lunar mission, IM-3. In November 2021, NASA selected a Nova-C mission for CLPS task order CP-11. The MoonLIGHT hardware was qualified for flight and has been in storage since December 2023. LUSEM was similarly qualified and delivered in 2023.

In 2024 the Intuitive Machines chief executive indicated that in addition to the lander, the IM-3 mission might deliver a data-relay satellite to lunar orbit. Additional reporting in 2025 indicated this work will be performed under a Near Space Network Services contract that NASA had previously awarded to Intuitive Machines.

The CADRE rovers were delivered to Intuitive Machines in 2025. The ALEPH-1 payload was approved in December 2025. In January 2026, the launch of IM-3 was expected to take place in second half 2026. In August 2026 NASA delivered to IM a NavCube3-mini navigation receiver for use on Altus-1. On 4 August 2026, NASA confirmed that IM-3 would launch with a total of 12 payloads. Of these, 5 are NASA payloads, 6 are commercial payloads, with one payload coming from the ISA. In September 2026, NASA announced that the mission had slipped to the "first part" of 2027.

== See also ==
- List of missions to the Moon
