= MoonLIGHT Pointing Actuator =

European Lunar laser ranging instrument

- Operator: European Space Agency
- Manufacturer: (Italy) Istituto Nazionale di Fisica Nucleare (United States) University of Maryland
- Instrument type: Corner reflector
- Function: Laser ranging
- Website: www.infn.it/en/moon

Properties
- Number launched: 1

Host spacecraft
- Spacecraft: Nova-C IM-3
- Launch date: 2027 (planned)
- Rocket: Falcon 9
- Launch site: KSC 39A

MoonLIGHT Pointing Actuator (MPAc) is a retroreflector instrument developed by the European Space Agency (ESA) that is expected to be placed on Lunar surface in 2027 by the IM-3 robotic lander. The instrument consists of a corner cube retroreflector (CCR) named MoonLIGHT (Moon Laser Instrumentation for General relativity High accuracy Tests), and an actuator designed to point the reflector towards Earth. It is expected to improve ranging precision of the distance between Earth and the Moon from centimeters towards the millimeter scale. The MoonLIGHT laser retroreflector was developed in collaboration between the University of Maryland in the United States and the Italian National Institute for Nuclear Physics - National Laboratories of Frascati (INFN-LNF) to complement and expand on the Lunar Laser Ranging experiment started with the Apollo Program in 1969.

== Science ==
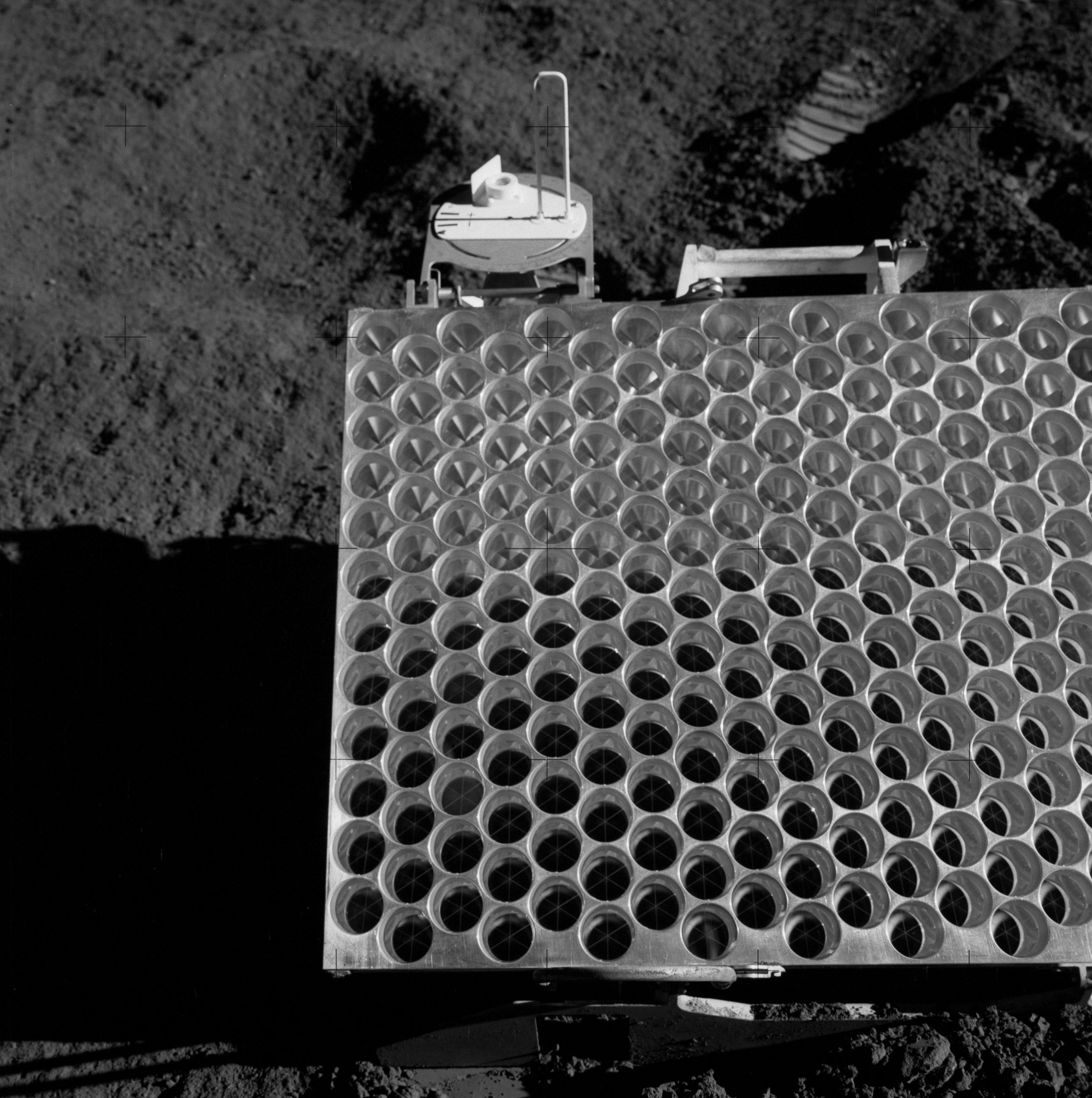
Apollo 15 deployed this Lunar Laser Ranging Retroreflector (LRRR)

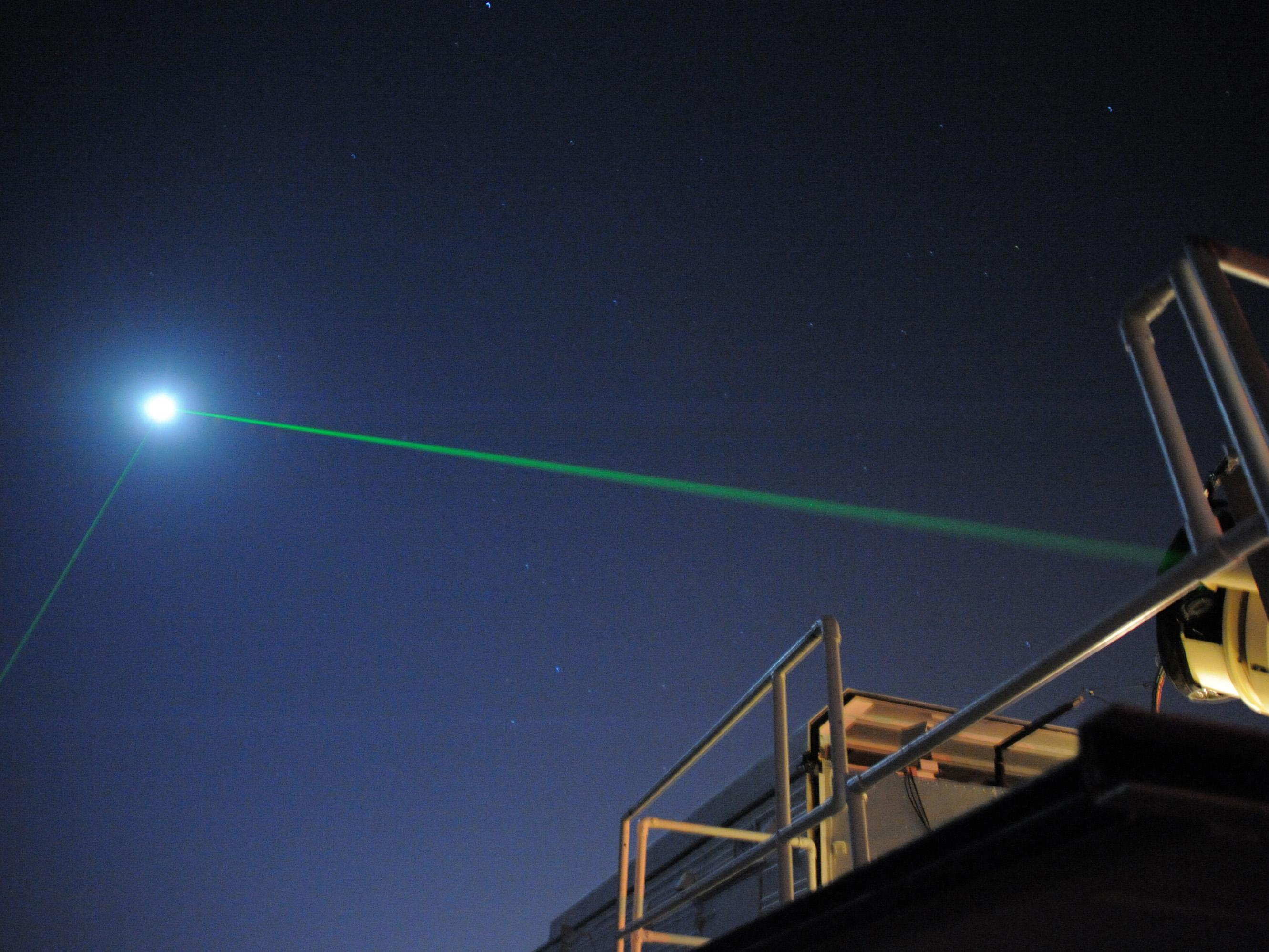
Lunar laser ranging at Goddard Space Flight Center

Laser Ranging is a technique used to perform accurate precision distance measurements between a laser and an optical target, called a retroreflector. Since 1969, it is possible to perform Lunar Laser Ranging (LLR) measurements thanks to the Cube Corner Retroreflector arrays placed on the lunar surface by the Apollo and Luna missions. The principle of this laser ranging is based on laser pulses sent from a telescope on Earth to the retroreflector array on the Moon. The retroreflector (mirrors) send the pulse straight back to the originating telescope where the round trip time—and therefore the exact distance—is recorded. The reflector arrays are designed to allow more accurate measurements from Earth that will increase lunar mapping accuracy, will test principles of Einstein's general theory of relativity, and other theories of gravity. Researchers think these studies may also help understand the nature of dark energy.

MoonLIGHT is a single 100 mm-large CCR developed as a collaboration primarily between the University of Maryland and the Italian National Institute for Nuclear Physics - National Laboratories of Frascati (INFN-LNF). Additional partners and collaborators include the Italian Space Agency's Matera Laser Ranging Observatory, as well as others laser ranging observatories and research institutes. This experiment will complement and advance the retroreflector experiments begun with Apollo 11 in 1969. The team claims to have developed a new approach and technology that would improve the ranging accuracy up to a factor of 100 (thus at a millimeter level) by using new technology and methods to correct for libration and the thermal behavior and the optical performance.

== History ==
The experiment and agreement between the collaborators was announced on 15 May 2015. The reflector was planned to be a secondary payload on the MX-1E lunar lander built by Moon Express, which was planned to be launched in 2020 with an Electron rocket. An unrelated planned science payload on the same lander was the International Lunar Observatory. The MX-1E lander was planned to land on the Malapert Mountain, a 5 km tall peak in the Aitken Basin region that has an uninterrupted direct line of sight to Earth. The launch contract between Moon Express and Rocket Lab (manufacturer of Electron) was canceled sometime before February 2020. Moon Express does not, as of February 2020, anymore plan to launch MX-1E on an Electron rocket, thus leaving MX-1E and all its science payloads without a carrier rocket.

In 2018 INFN proposed to ESA the MoonLIGHT Pointing Actuators (MPAc) project, able to perform automatic pointing operation of MoonLIGHT, on the contrary to the Apollo CCR arrays that were manually arranged by the astronauts. In 2019 ESA chose MPAc among 135 eligible scientific project proposals and, in 2021, ESA agreed with NASA to launch MPAc with a Commercial Lunar Payload Services (CLPS) mission. Nova-C, the lander on which MPAc will be integrated, is designed by Intuitive Machines and the expected launch date is in 2027. The landing site is Reiner Gamma, a lunar swirl on the western edge of the Moon, as seen from Earth. As of October 2026, MPAc has completed qualification and testing and was awaiting integration onto the IM-3 lander.

== See also ==
- List of European Space Agency programmes and missions
- List of retroreflectors on the Moon
- Satellite laser ranging
- PROSPECT – European instrument package for Lunar drilling
