= Seth Teller =

American computer scientist (1964–2014)

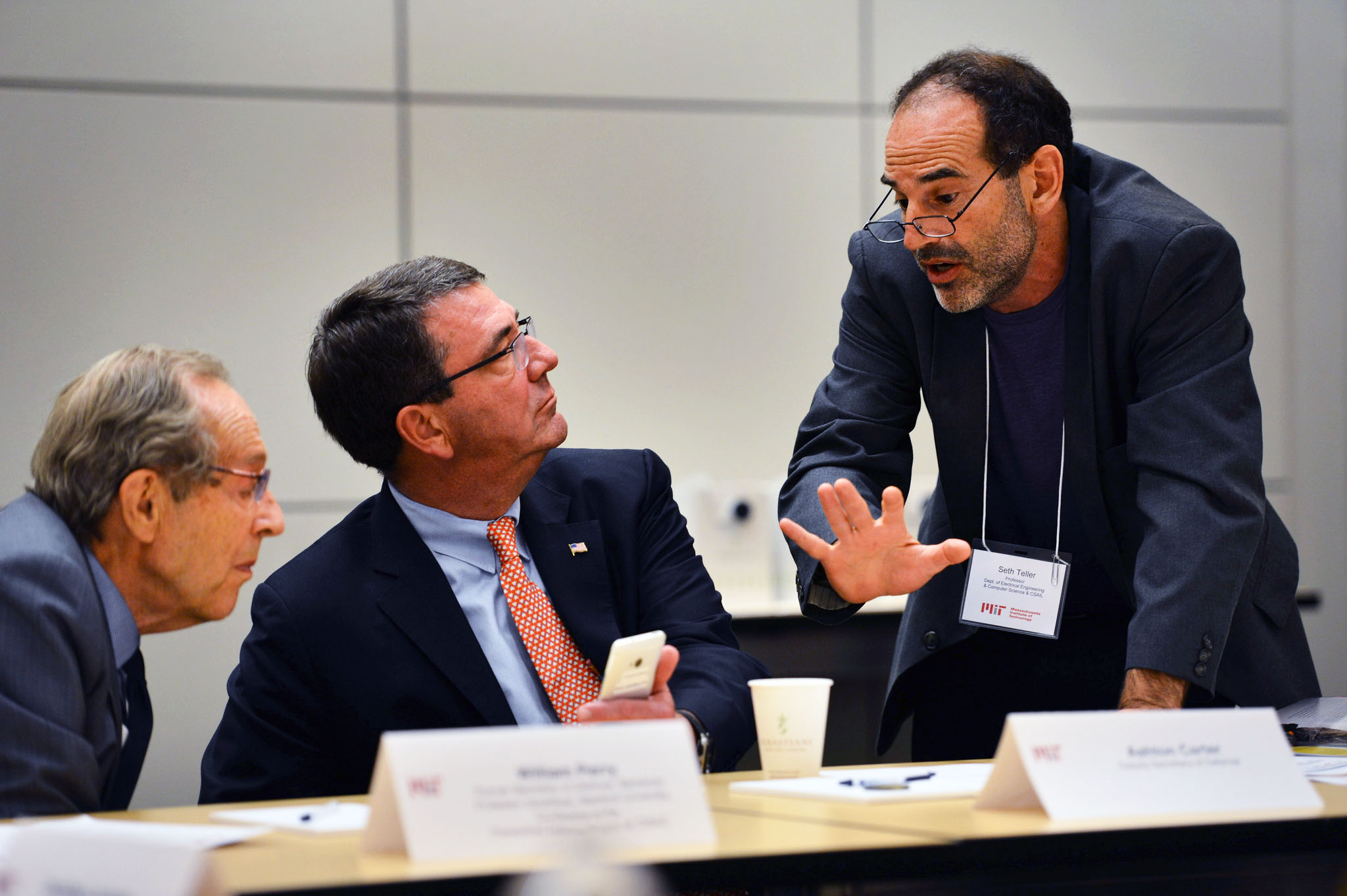
- Ash Carter and Seth Teller in 2013
- Born: May 28, 1964
- Died: July 1, 2014 (aged 50)
- Education: Wesleyan University (BA); University of California, Berkeley (MA, PhD)
- Scientific career
- Fields: Computer science
- Workplaces: Massachusetts Institute of Technology
- Thesis: Visibility Computations in Densely Occluded Polyhedral Environments (1992)
- Doctoral advisor: Carlo H. Séquin
- Notable students: Kavita Bala

Seth Jared Teller (May 28, 1964 – July 1, 2014) was an American computer scientist and professor at the Massachusetts Institute of Technology, whose research interests included computer vision, sensor networks, and robotics. In his Argus and Rover projects of the late 1990s, Teller was an early pioneer in the use of mobile cameras and geolocation to build three-dimensional models of cities.

== Early life ==
Teller's parents were Joan Teller and Samuel H. Teller of Bolton, Connecticut; Samuel Teller was a senior judge in the Connecticut Superior Court in Rockville.

Teller received his undergraduate degree from Wesleyan University, and a Ph.D. from the University of California, Berkeley in 1992. His dissertation, "Visibility Computations in Densely Occluded Polyhedral Environments," was supervised by Carlo H. Séquin.

== Academic career ==
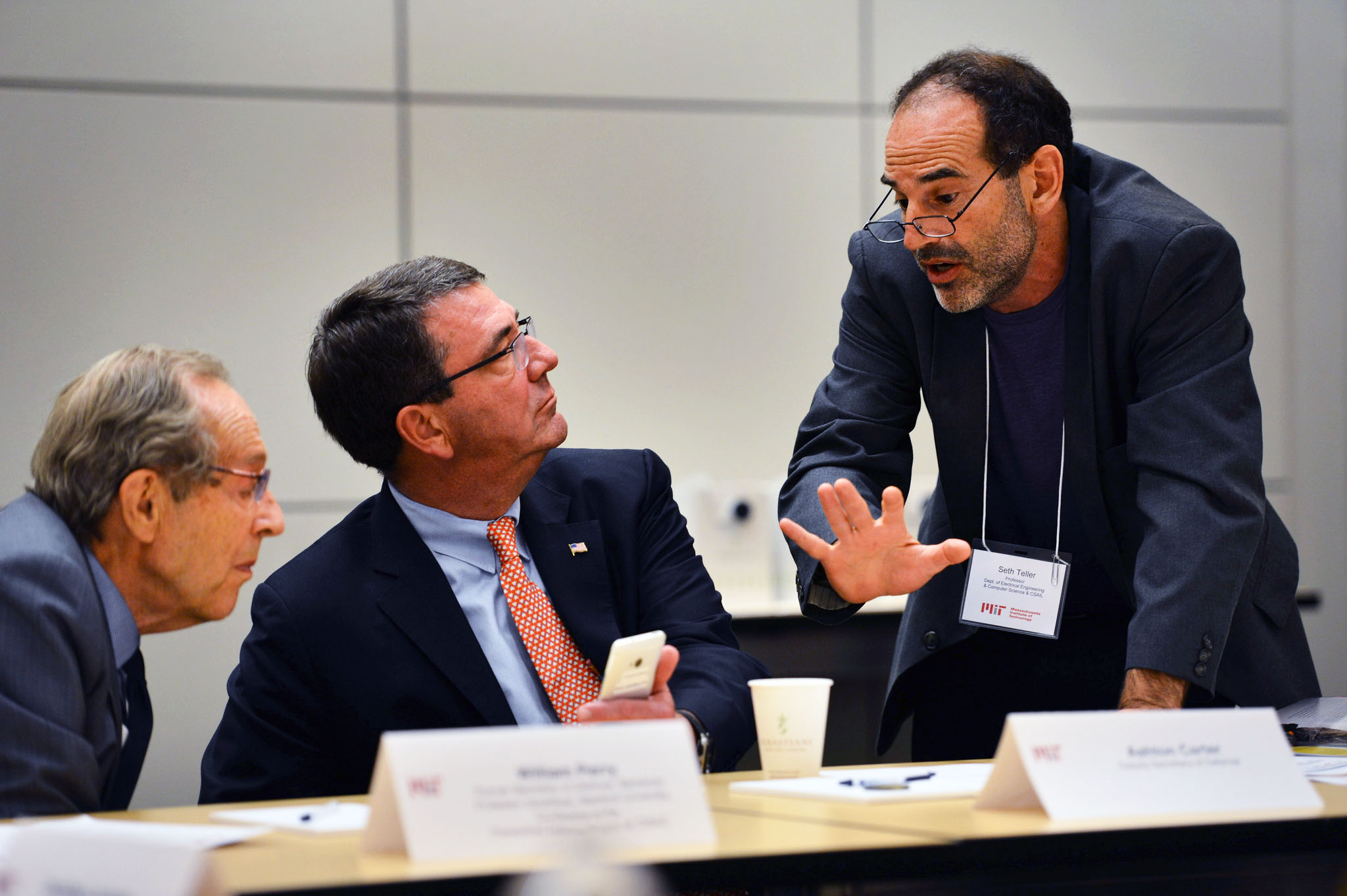
Teller briefing Ash Carter at MIT Lincoln Laboratory in July 2013

He was a post-doctoral fellow at the Computer Science Institute of the Hebrew University of Jerusalem and Princeton University's Computer Science Department.

Teller was awarded a Sloan Research Fellowship by the Alfred P. Sloan Foundation in 1997.

Teller was heading the Robotics, Vision, and Sensor Networks group at the MIT Computer Science and Artificial Intelligence Laboratory, conducting robotics and artificial intelligence research on developing robots with situational awareness. His work involved, in particular, creating various assistive technology robots and devices for people with disabilities. Teller's robotics projects included "a robotic, voice-controlled wheelchair, a wearable device for visually-impaired people that provides them with information about their surroundings, a self-driving car and an unmanned forklift". He also worked on developing technology for reducing the danger of first responders being hit by the passing vehicles while stopped to deal with highway accidents.

Teller was part of the MIT group developing software for a DoD robot, "Atlas", in the DARPA Robotics Challenge competition. Earlier, Teller's robotic car competed in the 2007 DARPA Urban Challenge competition.

In 2015, the Robotics Science and Systems Foundation established a Best Systems Paper Award in honor of Teller.

== Personal life and death ==
Seth Teller married Rachel Zimmerman, a journalist from New York, in September 2002. They had two daughters.

Teller was involved in neighborhood activism in Cambridge, Massachusetts and helped create the Neighborhood Association of East Cambridge.

Seth Teller died by suicide on July 1, 2014, at the age of 50, jumping off the Tobin Bridge. In 2024, Zimmerman published a book about the impact of her husband's death titled Us, After: A Memoir of Love and Suicide.
