= List of retroreflectors on the Moon =

Mirrors for measuring Earth–Moon distance

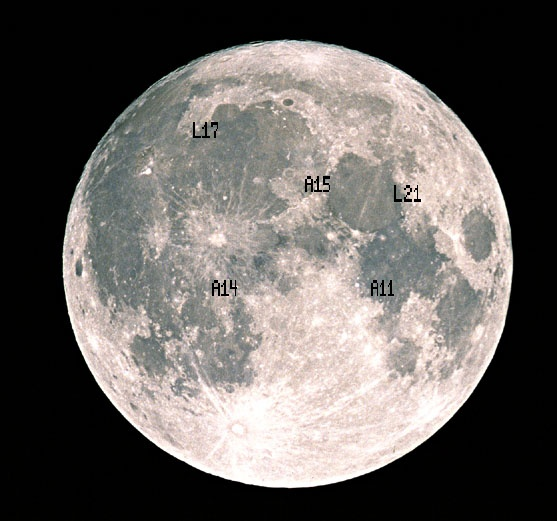
The locations of lunar retroreflectors left by Apollo (A) and Luna (L) missions.

Retroreflectors are devices which reflect light back to its source. Seven retroreflectors were left at seven sites on the Moon by three crews of the Apollo program, two by remote landers of the Lunokhod program, one by the Commercial Lunar Payload Services program and one by the Chandrayaan program. Lunar reflectors have enabled precise measurement of the Earth–Moon distance since 1969 using lunar laser ranging.

There have been several additional attempts to land retroreflectors on the lunar surface which were unsuccessful, and several future attempts are planned.

== Successfully placed reflectors ==
Operator	Mission	Name	Date	Location	Coordinates	Size	Status	Comment
NASA	Apollo 11	LRRR	21 July 1969	Mare Tranquillitatis	0.6734°N 23.4731°E	46×46 cm	Operational	
Soviet Union	Luna 17	Lunokhod 1	17 November 1970	Mare Imbrium	38.3152°N 35.0080°W	44×19 cm	Operational	Rediscovered in 2010
NASA	Apollo 14	LRRR	31 January 1971	Fra Mauro formation	3.6442°S 17.4786°W	46×46 cm	Operational	
NASA	Apollo 15	LRRR	31 July 1971	Hadley–Apennine	26.1334°N 3.6285°E	105×65 cm	Operational	
Soviet Union	Luna 21	Lunokhod 2	15 January 1973	Le Monnier crater	25.8323°N 30.9221°E	44×19 cm	Operational	
ISRO	Chandrayaan-3	Vikram	23 August 2023	Statio Shiv Shakti	69.367621°S 32.348126°E	5.11 cm diameter	Operational	
University of Maryland	Blue Ghost Mission 1	Next Generation Lunar Retroreflector	2 March 2025	Mare Crisium near Mons Latreille	18.56°N 61.81°E	10 cm diameter	Operational	

== Attempted and planned reflectors ==
Operator	Mission	Name	Date	Location	Coordinates	Status	Comment
SpaceIL, IAI	Beresheet	Beresheet	11 April 2019	Mare Serenitatis	32.5956°N 19.3496°E	Crashed	
ISRO	Chandrayaan-2	Vikram	6 September 2019		70.8810°S 22.7840°E	Crashed	
Moon Express	Lunar Scout	MoonLIGHT on MX-1E	July 2020	Malapert Mountain	84.9°S 12.9°E	Cancelled	
Astrobotic	Mission One	LRA on Peregrine	May 2023	Lacus Mortis		Aborted, controlled re-entry	
Roscosmos	Luna 25	Luna 25	August 2023	Pontécoulant G crater	57.865°S 61.360°E	Crashed	
Intuitive Machines	IM-1	LRA on Nova-C IM-1	February 2024	Malapert crater	80.13°S 1.44°E	Failed	
Intuitive Machines	IM-2	LRA on Nova-C IM-2	6 March 2025	Mons Mouton	85°S 31°W	Failed	

== Gallery ==
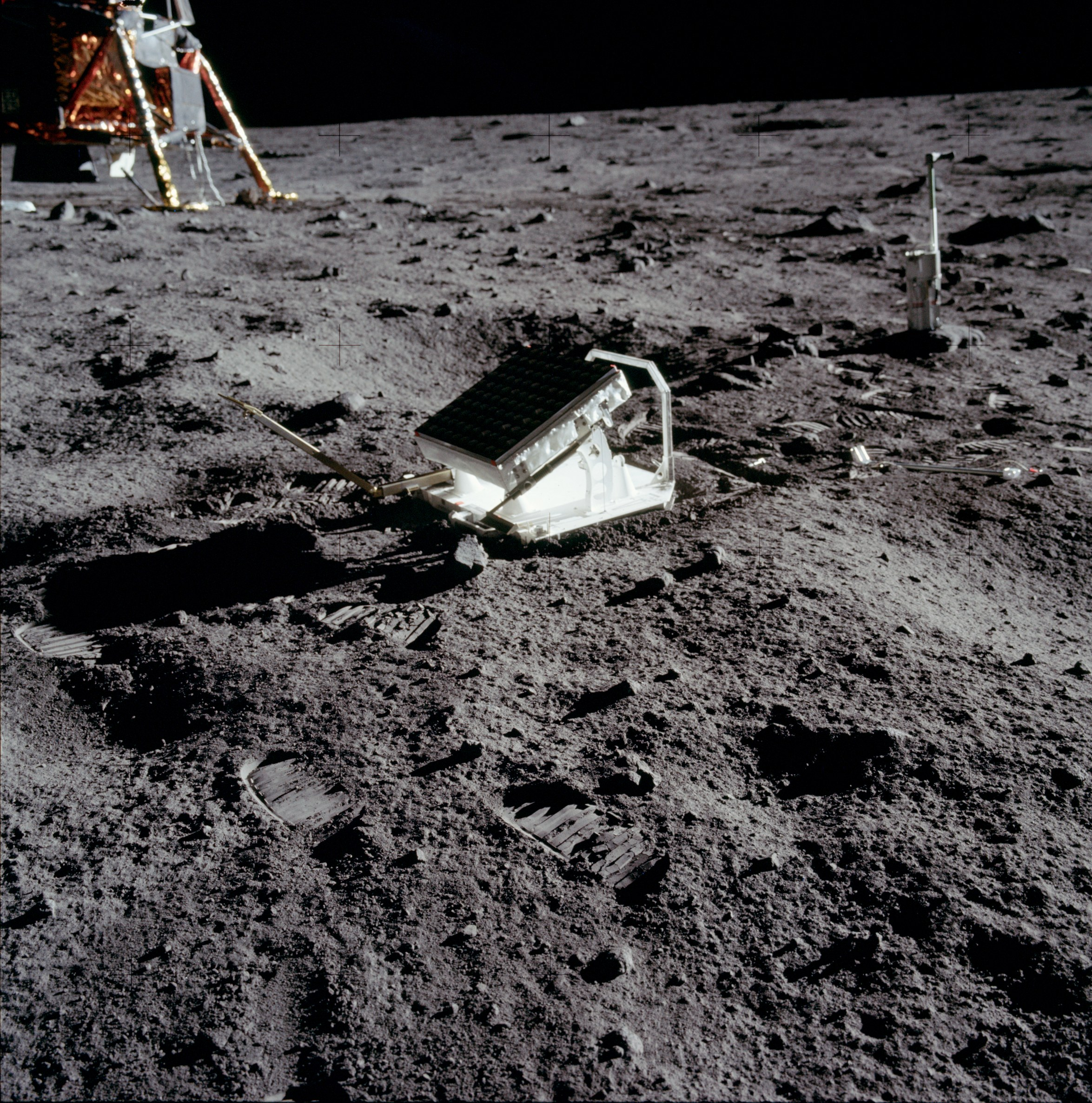
Apollo 11 Lunar Laser Ranging Retroreflector

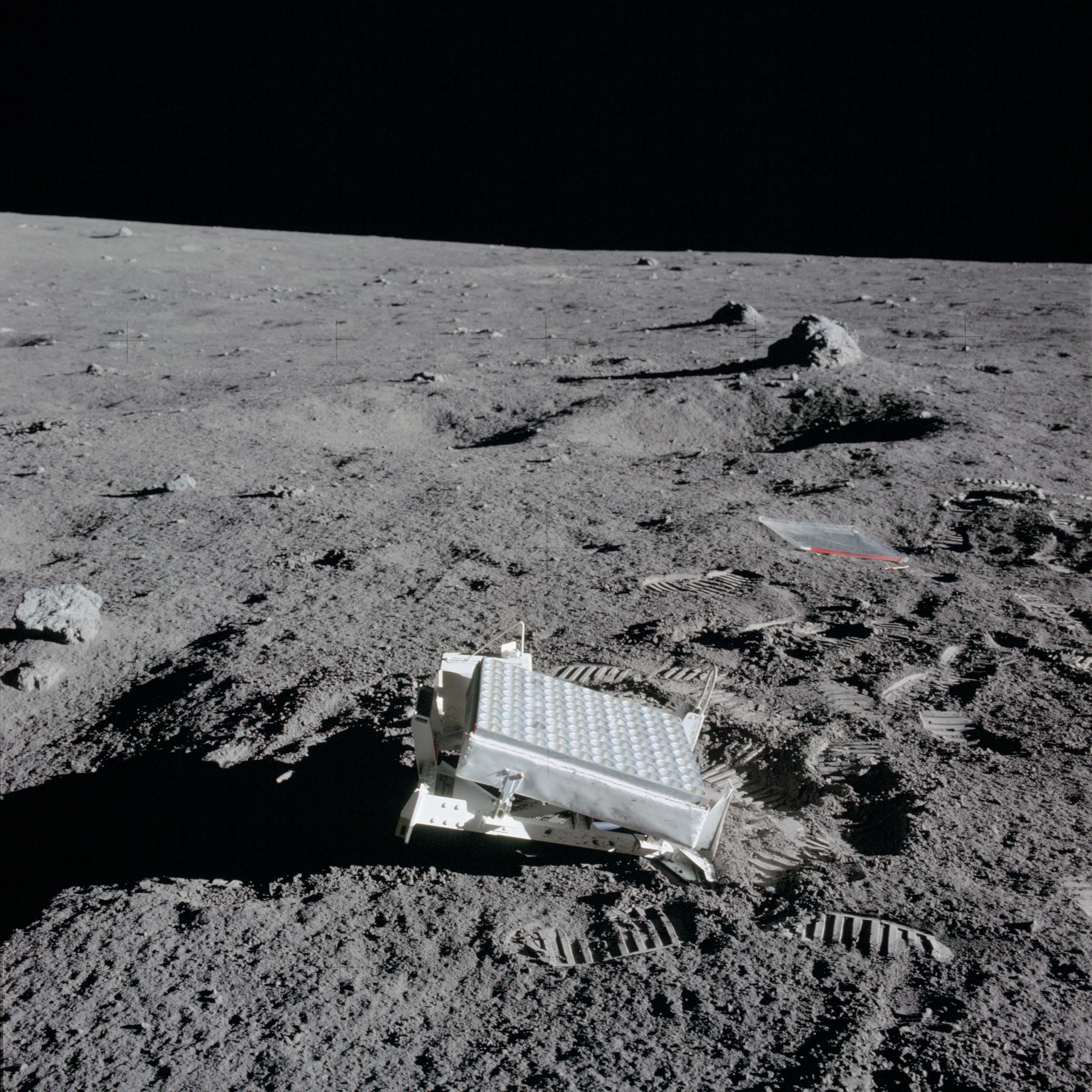
Apollo 14 retroreflector

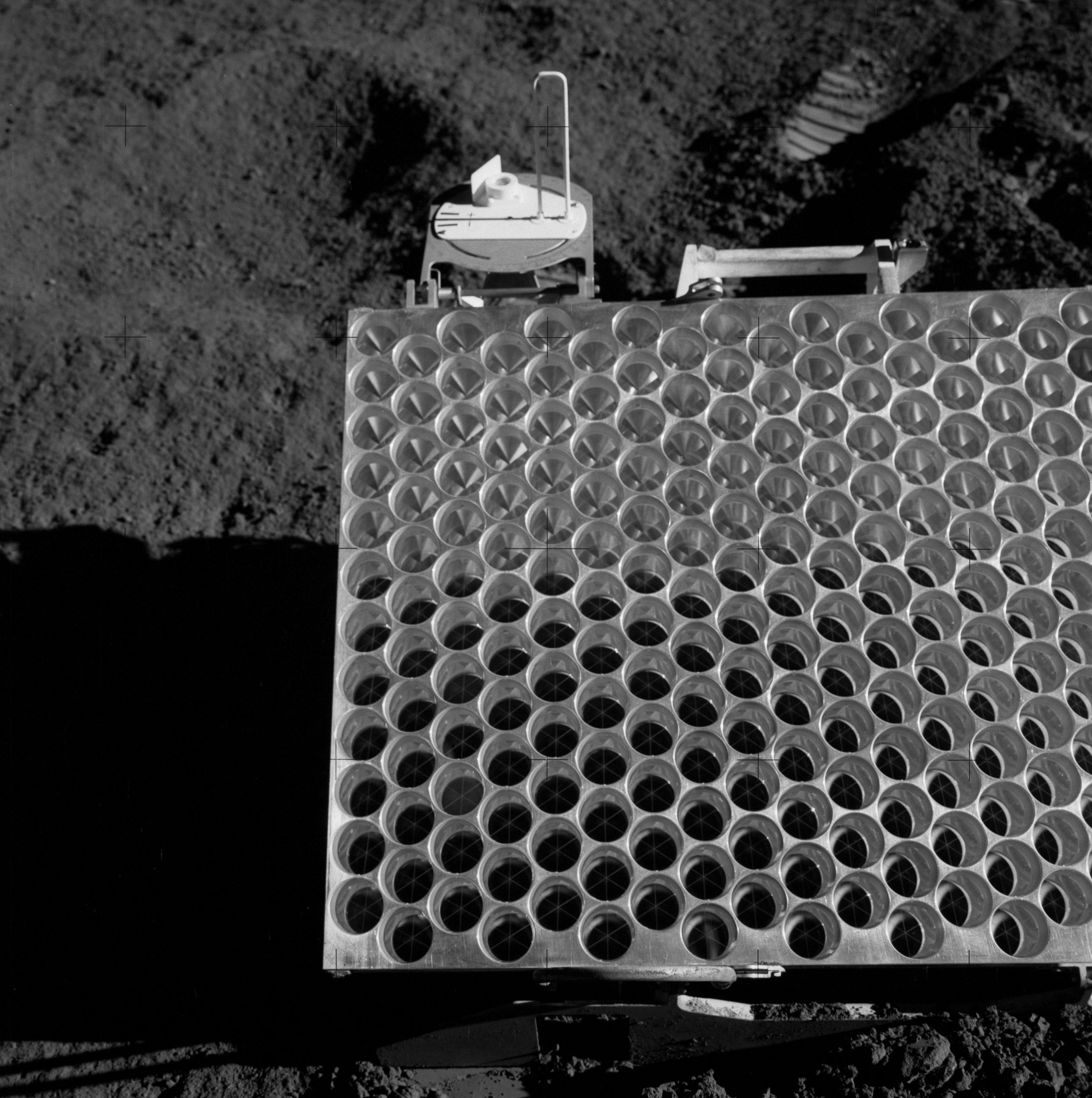
Close-up of Apollo 15 retroreflector

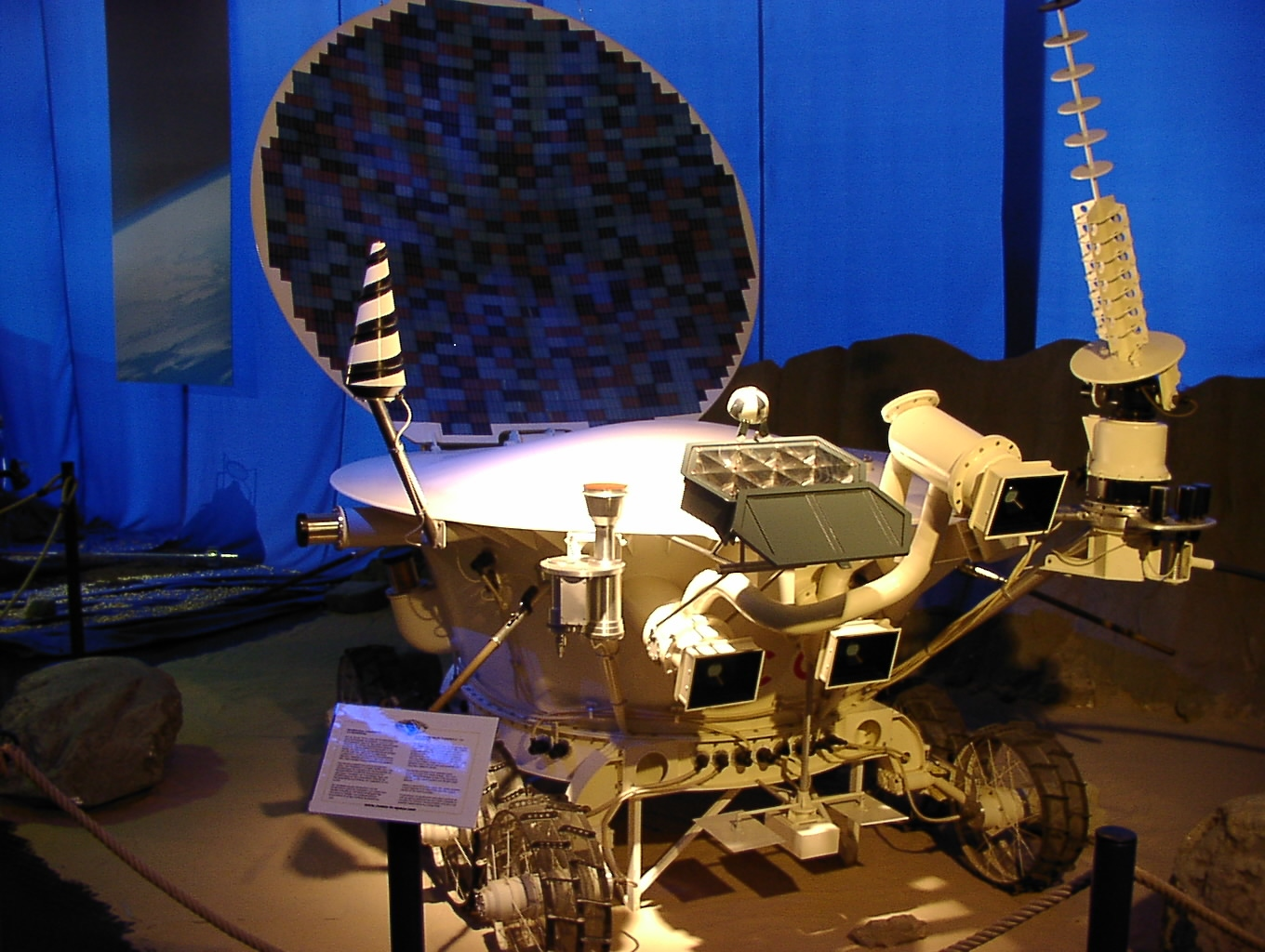
Model of Lunokhod 2. The retroreflector is the hexagonal box with open lid in the front.

== See also ==
- Lunar Laser Ranging experiment
- List of artificial objects on the Moon
- List of missions to the Moon
