= Giuseppe Colombo Centre for Space Geodesy =

Italian space research centre

- Sentinel-2 image of the Gulf of Taranto. Matera can be seen in the top left.
- Parent institution: Italian Space Agency
- Established: 1983
- Location: Italy
- Coordinates: 40.648326°N 16.703984°E
- Interactive map of Giuseppe Colombo Centre for Space Geodesy

The Giuseppe Colombo Centre for Space Geodesy (CGS) is a research centre belonging to the Italian Space Agency and located in Matera, Italy. It is dedicated to the mathematician Giuseppe Colombo and is focused on Earth observation (geodesy and satellite telemetry), space robotics and interplanetary missions. The centre was created in 1983 by CNR, Region Basilicata and NASA and is managed by Telespazio. It was initially focused on Earth observation only. Today it has about 100 employees and is used for research activities and operational services such as data acquisition from a number of European satellites and ground segment of the COSMO-SkyMed satellite constellation. The centre is also one of the X-band ground stations of the Sentinel constellation of ESA's Copernicus Programme.

== See also ==
- MoonLIGHT Pointing Actuator – European Lunar laser ranging instrument
