= Frank Smullin =

American sculptor (1943–1983)

- Born: 10 March 1943
- Died: 14 November 1983 (aged 40)
- Education: City University of New York
- Notable work: "Fit to be tied", "Untitled" (Boston University)
- Style: Analytic Constructivism

Frank Mayer Smullin (10 March 1943 – 14 November 1983) was an American sculptor known for pioneering computer-aided methods in art and for his large welded tubular sculptures.

== Biography ==
Frank Smullin was born on 10 March 1943 to Ruth (Frankel) and MIT electrical engineer Louis Smullin. A native of Cambridge, MA, Smullin graduated from Watertown schools and the Cambridge School of Weston before going on to earn a bachelor's in biology at Harvard University and a Master of Fine Arts at Queens College in 1972. He was a Fellow from 1979 to 1980 at MIT's Center for Advanced Visual Studies and Sculpture Space in Utica, New York, which helped enable him to make large-scale works.

Smullin married Ruth Ann Spivak and had twin daughters, and went on to teach design and art at Duke University, where his interdisciplinary course "Structures" was co-taught by Smullin together with the zoologist Steve Wainwright and engineer George Pearsall. Smullin died following a cerebral aneurism in his studio on 14 November 1983 at the age of 40.

== Sculptures ==
Smullin's art, which he referred to as Analytic Constructivism, includes massive sheet metal sculptures found around university campuses on the East Coast, including Boston University, Columbia University, and MIT. Three pieces are also held at the Smithsonian Institution.

In 1981, Smullin gave a keynote lecture about his tubular sculptures and techniques at a design conference in Nashville, paying particular attention to the granny-knot, which he found to have "an artistically much more interesting, 3-dimensional structure than the functionally preferred, but much flatter square-knot." Smullin had written a computer programme called SCULPT to assist with the vector analysis in his design process, implemented on a Tektronix 4052. He was calculating the elliptic intersections and producing computer-generated outlines of his sculptures which he would color by hand; he would then use a pen-plotter to produce a scale cardboard model, before finally cutting a rolling the final sheet-metal version; his techniques left a lasting influence on computer scientist Carlo Séquin, who was in the audience.

His nephew is actor Andras Jones.
