= Carroll Alley =

American physicist

Carroll Overton Alley, Jr. (June 13, 1927 – February 24, 2016) was an American physicist. He served as the Principal Investigator on the Apollo Program's Lunar Laser Ranging Experiment, which significantly restricted the possible range of spatial variation of the strength of the gravitational interaction. Alley was a PhD student of Robert Henry Dicke.

Alley’s goal was to understand quantum mechanics, gravitation, and relativity. His lifelong research interests included experimental and theoretical questions about the foundations of gravitational and quantum physics.

Alley developed some of the earliest important laboratory tests of Albert Einstein's theories of relativity. In recent years he became known for alternative theories of gravitation. He was a Physics professor at University of Maryland, College Park, emeritus since 2008, until his death on 24 February 2016.

== Career details ==
Professor C. O. Alley served as the first chairman of the Lunar Ranging Experiment team. He was the Principal Investigator (PI) for the Apollo 11 laser ranging retro-reflector (LR^{3}) experiment, deployed on the moon by Neil Armstrong and Buzz Aldrin in 1969. In addition to the gravitational interaction results mentioned above, the experiment measured the orbit of the moon to centimeter accuracy—and still produces data to this day. For this work he was awarded the NASA Exceptional Scientific Achievement Award in 1973; was designated by the Maryland Academy of Sciences, for their 1976 Bicentennial Exhibit, as one of two outstanding 20th Century Scientists; and received an honorary Doctor of Science degree from the University of Richmond in 1978.

Some additional accomplishments of Professor Alley, his graduate students, the Quantum Electronics Research and Lunar Ranging Experiment Teams, support staff, and numerous collaborators include:

- Surveyor 7 laser beam pointing tests in preparation for the Apollo 11 experiment and visual detection of laser beams from Earth, as well as subsequent lunar laser ranging on later Apollo missions
- Role in the commissioning of the Global Positioning System by contributing to the calculations that correct for time dilation in gravitational fields
- Conducting relativistic proper time experiments by flying caesium and rubidium atomic clocks in a Navy P3C aircraft over the Chesapeake Bay, to measure the effects of gravitational potential difference on their recorded proper times and comparing those times to ground clocks using short laser pulses
- Experiments in fundamental quantum mechanics with light quanta, including the first delayed-choice experiment in quantum mechanics
- First use of spontaneous parametric down conversion in quantum optics to exhibit entangled polarization quantum states of the Einstein-Podolsky-Rosen-Bohm type (thesis of Alley’s PhD student Yan Hua Shih)
- Direct measurements of possible difference in the one-way speed of light between the east-west and west-east directions on the rotating Earth, by flying atomic clocks between Christchurch, New Zealand, and Thule, Greenland

In later years Alley collaborated in the study, development, and application of a new formulation of gravity as curved spacetime found by Professor Huseyin Yilmaz. They postulated that the correct understanding of the lunar laser ranging measurements, the behavior of clocks in a global positioning system, and many strong gravity field astrophysical phenomena—such as gravitational radiation—require the interactive N-body solutions of the Yilmaz Theory (or "New Theory"), which are not present in Einstein’s General Relativity field equations. Alley maintained the validity of the Yilmaz Theoryand remained active in the study of gravitation until his death.

== Biography ==
Carroll O. Alley, Jr. was born in Richmond, VA to Carroll Overton Alley, Sr. and Mittie Points Alley on June 13, 1927. Alley attended John Marshall High School, where he was a swimmer, choir member, and Cadet Corps First Captain and Regimental Commander of A Company. He earned a B.S. in mathematics and physics from the University of Richmond in 1948, and returned there in 1951-’52 as a physics instructor.

Alley attended Princeton University, earning a master's degree (1952) and PhD (1962) in Physics. From 1954 to 1960, he was an instructor and lecturer in both Electrical Engineering and Physics at Princeton, where he met and married his late wife, Elizabeth (Slack) Delany Alley. His daughter Frances Alley Kruger was born in Princeton in 1955.

At Princeton, Alley studied electrical engineering as well as theoretical and experimental physics. He was greatly influenced by the work of Eugene Wigner and John Archibald Wheeler. His PhD dissertation developed new methods of detecting the ground state hyperfine transition in optically-pumped rubidium vapor for the type of atomic clock invented by Princeton professors Robert Henry Dicke—Alley’s thesis advisor—and Thomas R. Carver. This type of atomic clock was later used in the U.S. Global Positioning System and the European Union’s Galileo Global Positioning System.

Alley initiated laser physics research at the Institute of Optics and the Physics Department of the University of Rochester, where he was an assistant professor of physics and optics from 1960 to 1963. His daughter Margaret Alley Seymour was born in Rochester in 1961. In 1963 Alley was recruited to the University of Maryland, College Park Campus, by John S. Toll, then-chair of the Department of Physics and Astronomy.

For most of his career—more than 40 years—Alley served as professor of Physics and director of the Quantum Electronics Research Group at the University of Maryland. He taught and conducted research at Maryland from 1963 to 2008, at which time he was granted Professor Emeritus status—a post he held until his death on February 24, 2016.
