= Fundamental station =

Category of observatory

The term fundamental station is used for special observatories which combine several space positioning techniques like VLBI, satellite laser ranging, GPS, Glonass, etc. They are the basis of plate tectonic analysis, allowing the monitoring of continental drift rates with millimetre accuracies. A fundamental point is the geometric origin of a geodetic network and defines the geodetic datum of a national survey.

Some fundamental stations are an astronomical or satellite geodetic observatory. The geographic latitude and longitude of the station is precisely determined by methods of astrogeodesy and is chosen as ellipsoidal latitude and longitude at the Earth ellipsoid which is used to calculate the coordinates of the whole network.

Also, precise azimuths to one or two network points are observed, and are taken over as orientated directions of these network lines. By these procedures, the polar axis of the reference ellipsoid becomes parallel to the Earth rotation axis, and therefore the vertical deflection of the fundamental point is zero.

Important fundamental stations include:

- Grasse Métrologie Optique (MéO) observatory, France
- Graz-Lustbühel, Austria
- Herstmonceux Geodetic Observatory, England
- Onsala Space Observatory, Sweden
- Metsähovi Radio Observatory, Finland
- Geodetic Observatory Wettzell, Germany
- Zimmerwald Observatory, Switzerland
- Goddard Geophysical and Astronomical Observatory, U.S.
- Hartebeesthoek Radio Astronomy Observatory, South Africa
- Yarragadee Geodetic Observatory, Australia.

Worldwide about 30 fundamental stations are in existence: about 5 in the United States and in Commonwealth of Independent States countries, and 2–3 in South America, Africa, Eastern Asia, Australia and Antarctica.

The basic coordinate system is the ITRF reference frame, which is related to the ICRS celestial inertial system by means of very precise Earth Orientation Parameters (EOPs), containing polar coordinates, Earth rotation and nutation parameters. The ITRF data set is revised every 3–5 years, the actual accuracy is in the millimeter area. The ICRS is based on about 500 quasars in the far universe, and on some 3000 fundamental stars of our galaxy. The actual coordinates of the latter (FK6) were published in 2000 by the Astronomisches Rechen-Institut (ARI) in Heidelberg.
