= James E. Faller =

American physicist

James E. Faller (January 17, 1934 – June 14, 2023) was an American physicist and inventor who specialized in the field of gravity. He conceived the Lunar Laser Ranging Program, the goal of which, was to fire high powered laser beams at special retroreflectors placed on the Moon by Apollo program Astronauts. He invented a gravity motion sensor, called the Absolute Gravimeter, which is sensitive enough to detect changes in the local gravitational field due to a person's mass. His work was featured in many books and magazines, such as National Geographic. In 2001, his gravity detection device was featured on the Science Channel in the show Head Rush and was used to debunk anti-gravity devices that were for sale on the market. All devices tested on the show did not produce any kinds of gravitational anomalies. In that same year, he received the Joseph F. Keithley Award for Advances in Measurement Science. His research interests included geophysics, experimental relativity, fundamental constants, and precision measurement experiments designed to look for possible invalidations of accepted physical laws at extreme magnitudes. He worked for the National Institute of Standards and Technology (NIST) and was working on a new measurement of G, the Newtonian constant of gravitation. Faller died on June 14, 2023, at the age of 89.

== Awards and honors ==
In 2001 James received the Joseph F. Keithley Award For Advances in Measurement Science. The citation for the award was "For the development of sensitive gravitational detectors and their successful application to the study of physics and geophysics."

- Joseph F. Keithley Award, 2001;
- Federal Laboratory Consortium Technology Transfer Award, 1992;
- Department of Commerce Gold medal, 1990;
- NASA Group Achievement Award and also NASA Exceptional Scientific Achievement Medal, 1973;
- Alfred P. Sloan Fellowship, 1972–1973;
- National Bureau of Standards Precision Measurement Award, 1970; And Arnold O. Beckman Award of the Instrument Society of America, 1970.

== Research interests ==
- Geophysics
- Experimental Relativity
- Fundamental Constants
- Precision measurement
