= Giorgio Fiocco =

Italian physicist (1931–2012)

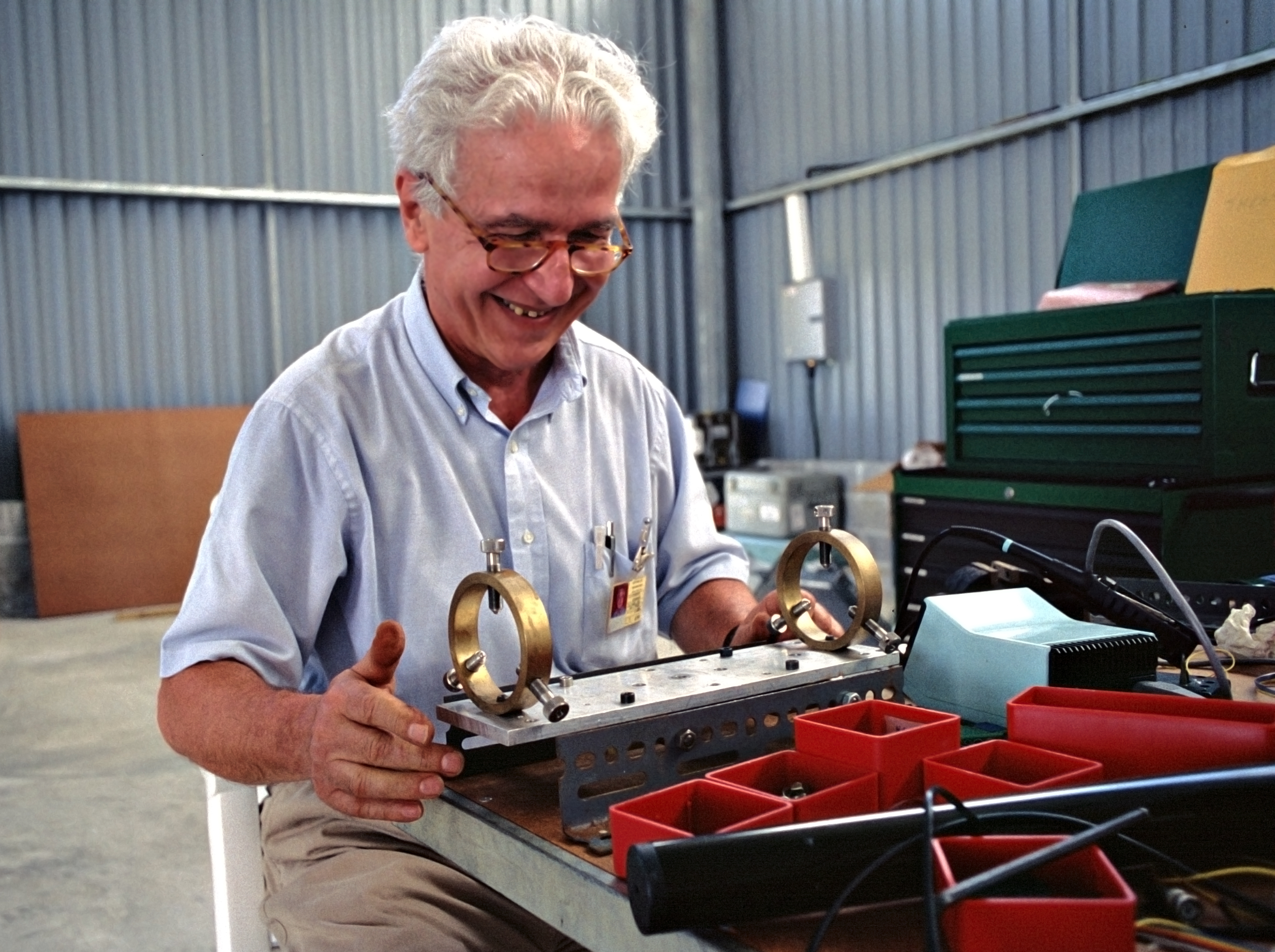
- Born: 13 June 1931; Rome, Italy
- Died: 31 July 2012 (aged 81); Rome, Italy
- Known for: Atmospheric Physics; Lidar
- Scientific career
- Fields: Physics
- Workplaces: Sapienza University of Rome

Giorgio Fiocco (13 June 1931 – 31 July 2012) was an Italian physicist, known for the development of the Lidar for the remote sensing of the atmosphere.

In 1962 at MIT, together with Louis Smullin, Fiocco developed the first Lidar system, aiming a laser beam to the Moon and detecting the return pulse. Fiocco was full professor of geophysics at the University of Florence, then since 1974, professor of Terrestrial Physics at the Sapienza University of Rome. From 1994 to 1995 Fiocco was president of the Italian Space Agency. Fiocco pioneered the application of the Lidar to the remote sensing of the atmosphere.

He died in Rome on 31 July 2012.

== Publications ==
- Smullin, Louis D.; Fiocco, Giorgio (1962). "Optical Echoes from the Moon". Nature. 194 (4835): 1267. Bibcode:1962Natur.194.1267S. doi:10.1038/1941267a0. S2CID 4145783.
- The Mount Pinatubo Eruption - Effects on the Atmosphere and Climate. Springer. 1996.
- Castracane, Paolo; Selmi, Luigi; Casadio, Stefano; Cacciani, Marco; Fiocco, Giorgio (2001). "Ground-based remote sensing of wind, temperature and aerosol backscattering in an urban environment during different atmospheric stability conditions". Physics and Chemistry of the Earth, Part B. 26 (3): 239. Bibcode:2001PCEB...26..239C. doi:10.1016/S1464-1909(00)00246-X.
