= Louis Smullin =

American electrical engineer (1916–2009)

- Born: February 5, 1916; Detroit, Michigan, US
- Died: June 4, 2009 (aged 93); Newton, Massachusetts, US
- Education: Wayne State University; University of Michigan (BS); Massachusetts Institute of Technology (MS)
- Known for: Measuring the distance to the Moon using a ruby laser
- Spouse: Ruth Frankel
- Scientific career
- Fields: electrical engineering
- Institutions: Massachusetts Institute of Technology; Bendix Aviation; Federal Telecommunications Laboratory
- Thesis: The Acceleration and Focusing of Electrons in Multi-Stage Tubes (MS) (1939)
- Academic advisors: John G. Trump (MS)

Louis Dijour Smullin (February 5, 1916 – June 4, 2009) was an American electrical engineer who spend most of his career at the Massachusetts Institute of Technology (MIT). He is best known for his work with Giorgio Fiocco to measure the distance to the Moon using a ruby laser in 1962, shortly after that device was invented. Earlier, he had worked in the microwave radar field at the MIT Radiation Laboratory and was instrumental in creating the Lincoln Laboratory that carried on this work. Later he worked on developing instrumentation for nuclear fusion research and many other projects. He retired in 1986 but worked in the department until 2001.

== Life and career ==
Smullin was born in Detroit to Isaac M. Smullin and Ida May. His parents were Russian Jewish immigrants. His father was an advocate for the Communist International Labor Defense, was involved with Th. L. Poindexter in Detroit around 1938 in the Roumanian Workers Educational Association of America, and later established the Worker's Camp. In 1957, his parents were called before by the House Un-American Activities Committee.

Smullin spent two years at the local Wayne State University and then moved to the University of Michigan in Ann Arbor, where he received the BSE in electrical engineering in 1936. After two years of working in the industry, he enrolled at the Massachusetts Institute of Technology and in 1939 earned his Master of Science with the work in "The Acceleration and Focusing of Electrons in Multi-Stage Tubes" under the supervision of John G. Trump. In June he married Ruth Frankel (died 2011).

In 1936, he worked for several months as a draftsman for the Swift Electric Welder Company. At the Ohio Brass Company in Barberton, he spent two years performing high voltage tests on transmission-line insulators and radio interference. After MIT, he joined Farnsworth Television and Radio in Fort Wayne, Indiana. Here he designed and tested photomultiplier tubes.

After the outbreak of war, in 1940 he moved to the Scintilla Magneto Division of Bendix Aviation in Sidney, New York, where Smullin designed test instruments for ignition systems. His thesis advisor at MIT then asked him to join the newly formed MIT Radiation Laboratory (RadLab) in 1941, where he became head of the Radiation Laboratory transmitter/receiver switch and duplexer section. These circuits allow a single antenna to be used for transmission and reception by switching it between the separate transmitter and receiver circuits. The group also developed methods for testing transceiver microwave tubes at over 3 GHz and designed most radar duplexers until the end of the war.

After the war, in 1946 he then spent a short time at the Federal Telecommunications Laboratory in Nutley, New Jersey. In 1947 he returned to MIT to organize and lead the Microwave Tube Laboratory of the Laboratory of Electronics. He helped plan and set up the MIT Lincoln Laboratory in Lexington, Massachusetts, which MIT President James Rhyne Killian had resisted in 1951. In 1952 he became head of the radar and weapons department at the Lincoln Lab.

In 1955 he returned to the MIT Cambridge campus as associate professor of Electrical Engineering and was appointed Professor in 1960. After the invention of the ruby laser, along with atmosphere physicist Giorgio Fiocco, on the evenings of 9–11 May 1962 Smullin transmitted pulses of laser light to the Moon and used this to determine the distance to the Moon with new accuracy. Fiocco further developed these concepts as LIDAR.

From 1966 to February 1974 he was head of the electrical engineering department. One of his inventions enabled the study of controlled thermonuclear fusion. After 1974, he returned to teaching and helped build the MIT Electrical Engineering and Computer Science Department (EECS) until the 1980s. After retiring in 1986, he still cycled to the Institute every day to continue his work on fusion research until he suffered a stroke in 2001. He died eight years later at the nursing home Lasell House in Newton.

In 1968 he was appointed a Fellow of the American Physical Society. He was also a member of the American Society of Arts and Sciences, the National Academy of Engineering, Eta Kappa Nu and Sigma Xi.

Smullin died in Newton, Massachusetts.

With his wife, Ruth Frankel, he was the father of the sculptor Frank Smullin, and the grandfather of actor, author, and musician Andras Jones.
