= Giuseppe Colombo =

Italian physicist and mathematician (1920–1984)

Giuseppe "Bepi" Colombo (2 October 1920 in Padua – 20 February 1984 in Padua) was an Italian scientist, mathematician and engineer at the University of Padua, Italy.

== Mercury ==
Colombo studied the planet Mercury, and it was his calculations which showed how to get a spacecraft into a solar orbit which would encounter Mercury multiple times, using a gravity assist manoeuvre with Venus. Due to this idea, NASA was able to have the Mariner 10 accomplish three fly-bys of Mercury instead of one. Mariner 10 was the first spacecraft to use gravity assist. Since then, the technique has become common.

Colombo also explained the spin-orbit resonance in Mercury's orbit, showing that it rotates three times for every two orbits around the Sun.

== Saturn's rings ==
Colombo also made significant contributions to the study of Saturn's rings, mostly using ground-based observations in the era before space exploration reached the outer Solar System.

== Other contributions ==
- Colombo invented the concept of tethers for tying satellites together.
- Colombo participated in the planning of Giotto, the European Space Agency's mission to Halley's Comet, but died before the spacecraft was launched. He produced the HAPPEN proposal involving using parts for a planned Geos-3 satellite to first examine the Earth's Magnetotail before flying through the tail of Halley’s comet in March 1986. This was rejected by the Solar System working group for not offering to return enough information on Halley.

== Legacy ==
- The Giuseppe Colombo Centre for Space Geodesy in Matera, Italy.
- ESA awards a 'Colombo fellowship' each year to a European scientist working in the field of astronautics

Several astronomical objects and spaceships are named to honour him:

- The ESA-JAXA mission to Mercury, which launched at 1:45:28 UTC on 20 October 2018, is named BepiColombo.
- The Colombo Gap in Saturn's rings.
- The asteroid 10387 Bepicolombo
