= List of minor planets: 527001–528000 =

The following is a partial list of minor planets, running from minor-planet number 527001 through 528000, inclusive. The primary data for this and other partial lists is based on JPL's "Small-Body Orbital Elements" and data available from the Minor Planet Center. Critical list information is also provided by the MPC, unless otherwise specified from Lowell Observatory. A detailed description of the table's columns and additional sources are given on the main page including a complete list of every page in this series, and a statistical break-up on the dynamical classification of minor planets.

Also see the summary list of all named bodies in numerical and alphabetical order, and the corresponding naming citations for the number range of this particular list. New namings may only be added to this list after official publication, as the preannouncement of names is condemned by the Working Group for Small Bodies Nomenclature of the International Astronomical Union.

Near-Earth obj.	MBA (inner)	MBA (outer)	Centaur
Mars-crosser	MBA (middle)	Jupiter trojan	Trans-Neptunian obj.
Unclassified

== 527001–527100 ==
Designation			Discovery			Properties		Ref
Permanent	Provisional	Named after	Date	Site	Discoverer(s)	Category	Diam.	Ref
527001	2007 RO_{137}	—	August 24, 2007	Kitt Peak	Spacewatch	·	430 m	MPC · JPL
527002	2007 RD_{138}	—	September 5, 2007	Mount Lemmon	Mount Lemmon Survey	·	2.3 km	MPC · JPL
527003	2007 RX_{139}	—	September 14, 2007	Anderson Mesa	LONEOS	·	980 m	MPC · JPL
527004	2007 RO_{144}	—	September 14, 2007	Socorro	LINEAR	·	540 m	MPC · JPL
527005	2007 RC_{149}	—	September 12, 2007	Catalina	CSS	EMA	2.9 km	MPC · JPL
527006	2007 RU_{158}	—	August 24, 2007	Kitt Peak	Spacewatch	·	590 m	MPC · JPL
527007	2007 RQ_{161}	—	September 13, 2007	Mount Lemmon	Mount Lemmon Survey	THM	1.9 km	MPC · JPL
527008	2007 RH_{168}	—	September 10, 2007	Kitt Peak	Spacewatch	NYS	1.2 km	MPC · JPL
527009	2007 RK_{170}	—	August 24, 2007	Kitt Peak	Spacewatch	·	1.9 km	MPC · JPL
527010	2007 RM_{170}	—	September 10, 2007	Kitt Peak	Spacewatch	EOS	1.5 km	MPC · JPL
527011	2007 RS_{170}	—	September 3, 2007	Catalina	CSS	·	560 m	MPC · JPL
527012	2007 RP_{172}	—	September 10, 2007	Kitt Peak	Spacewatch	·	580 m	MPC · JPL
527013	2007 RK_{180}	—	September 11, 2007	Catalina	CSS	·	2.6 km	MPC · JPL
527014	2007 RB_{182}	—	March 8, 2005	Mount Lemmon	Mount Lemmon Survey	·	1.6 km	MPC · JPL
527015	2007 RL_{185}	—	September 13, 2007	Mount Lemmon	Mount Lemmon Survey	·	1.9 km	MPC · JPL
527016	2007 RO_{204}	—	September 9, 2007	Kitt Peak	Spacewatch	GAL	1.9 km	MPC · JPL
527017	2007 RT_{204}	—	September 9, 2007	Kitt Peak	Spacewatch	HOF	2.4 km	MPC · JPL
527018	2007 RN_{209}	—	September 10, 2007	Kitt Peak	Spacewatch	·	2.2 km	MPC · JPL
527019	2007 RE_{214}	—	September 12, 2007	Kitt Peak	Spacewatch	·	2.1 km	MPC · JPL
527020	2007 RG_{223}	—	September 13, 2007	Catalina	CSS	NYS	1.1 km	MPC · JPL
527021	2007 RR_{227}	—	September 10, 2007	Mount Lemmon	Mount Lemmon Survey	·	3.2 km	MPC · JPL
527022	2007 RY_{233}	—	September 12, 2007	Catalina	CSS	·	980 m	MPC · JPL
527023	2007 RF_{236}	—	September 13, 2007	Mount Lemmon	Mount Lemmon Survey	H	480 m	MPC · JPL
527024	2007 RB_{239}	—	September 14, 2007	Anderson Mesa	LONEOS	·	770 m	MPC · JPL
527025	2007 RB_{243}	—	September 3, 2007	Catalina	CSS	·	2.8 km	MPC · JPL
527026	2007 RG_{244}	—	August 10, 2007	Kitt Peak	Spacewatch	NYS	680 m	MPC · JPL
527027	2007 RS_{247}	—	September 13, 2007	Catalina	CSS	·	2.4 km	MPC · JPL
527028	2007 RD_{257}	—	September 9, 2007	Anderson Mesa	LONEOS	·	950 m	MPC · JPL
527029	2007 RL_{261}	—	September 14, 2007	Kitt Peak	Spacewatch	·	2.5 km	MPC · JPL
527030	2007 RS_{263}	—	September 15, 2007	Mount Lemmon	Mount Lemmon Survey	MAR	970 m	MPC · JPL
527031	2007 RU_{266}	—	September 15, 2007	Kitt Peak	Spacewatch	TEL	1.6 km	MPC · JPL
527032	2007 RD_{270}	—	September 15, 2007	Mount Lemmon	Mount Lemmon Survey	·	790 m	MPC · JPL
527033	2007 RB_{272}	—	September 15, 2007	Kitt Peak	Spacewatch	·	2.3 km	MPC · JPL
527034	2007 RV_{272}	—	September 15, 2007	Kitt Peak	Spacewatch	·	760 m	MPC · JPL
527035	2007 RM_{280}	—	September 13, 2007	Catalina	CSS	·	2.8 km	MPC · JPL
527036	2007 RF_{288}	—	September 11, 2007	Mount Lemmon	Mount Lemmon Survey	·	1.9 km	MPC · JPL
527037	2007 RZ_{288}	—	September 9, 2007	Mount Lemmon	Mount Lemmon Survey	THM	2.0 km	MPC · JPL
527038	2007 RU_{289}	—	September 14, 2007	Mount Lemmon	Mount Lemmon Survey	·	2.2 km	MPC · JPL
527039	2007 RX_{289}	—	September 14, 2007	Mount Lemmon	Mount Lemmon Survey	THM	2.1 km	MPC · JPL
527040	2007 RK_{290}	—	September 10, 2007	Kitt Peak	Spacewatch	·	2.3 km	MPC · JPL
527041	2007 RZ_{290}	—	September 2, 2007	Siding Spring	K. Sárneczky, L. Kiss	·	540 m	MPC · JPL
527042	2007 RR_{291}	—	September 12, 2007	Mount Lemmon	Mount Lemmon Survey	·	1.6 km	MPC · JPL
527043	2007 RW_{293}	—	September 13, 2007	Mount Lemmon	Mount Lemmon Survey	(2076)	810 m	MPC · JPL
527044	2007 RP_{294}	—	September 14, 2007	Mount Lemmon	Mount Lemmon Survey	·	2.3 km	MPC · JPL
527045	2007 RX_{295}	—	September 15, 2007	Kitt Peak	Spacewatch	·	1.9 km	MPC · JPL
527046	2007 RJ_{296}	—	September 14, 2007	Mount Lemmon	Mount Lemmon Survey	·	2.1 km	MPC · JPL
527047	2007 RG_{301}	—	September 13, 2007	Mount Lemmon	Mount Lemmon Survey	MAS	400 m	MPC · JPL
527048	2007 RV_{301}	—	September 14, 2007	Mount Lemmon	Mount Lemmon Survey	·	1.7 km	MPC · JPL
527049	2007 RX_{301}	—	September 14, 2007	Mount Lemmon	Mount Lemmon Survey	EOS	1.8 km	MPC · JPL
527050	2007 RY_{302}	—	September 14, 2007	Mount Lemmon	Mount Lemmon Survey	·	1.4 km	MPC · JPL
527051	2007 RA_{303}	—	September 14, 2007	Mount Lemmon	Mount Lemmon Survey	·	2.4 km	MPC · JPL
527052	2007 RY_{307}	—	September 4, 2007	Mount Lemmon	Mount Lemmon Survey	AGN	1.1 km	MPC · JPL
527053	2007 RV_{309}	—	September 14, 2007	Catalina	CSS	H	510 m	MPC · JPL
527054	2007 RX_{309}	—	September 13, 2007	Mount Lemmon	Mount Lemmon Survey	·	2.2 km	MPC · JPL
527055	2007 RW_{310}	—	June 21, 2007	Mount Lemmon	Mount Lemmon Survey	·	2.3 km	MPC · JPL
527056	2007 RA_{312}	—	September 10, 2007	Catalina	CSS	H	550 m	MPC · JPL
527057	2007 RU_{312}	—	September 15, 2007	Catalina	CSS	TIR	2.5 km	MPC · JPL
527058	2007 RF_{313}	—	September 5, 2007	Catalina	CSS	·	1.0 km	MPC · JPL
527059	2007 RO_{315}	—	September 12, 2007	Kitt Peak	Spacewatch	·	2.4 km	MPC · JPL
527060	2007 RO_{316}	—	September 9, 2007	Kitt Peak	Spacewatch	·	930 m	MPC · JPL
527061	2007 RS_{316}	—	September 9, 2007	Mount Lemmon	Mount Lemmon Survey	·	2.4 km	MPC · JPL
527062	2007 RL_{318}	—	September 11, 2007	Kitt Peak	Spacewatch	·	3.1 km	MPC · JPL
527063	2007 RW_{324}	—	September 12, 2007	Mount Lemmon	Mount Lemmon Survey	·	2.0 km	MPC · JPL
527064	2007 RK_{327}	—	September 14, 2007	Mount Lemmon	Mount Lemmon Survey	·	1.9 km	MPC · JPL
527065	2007 RV_{327}	—	September 12, 2007	Mount Lemmon	Mount Lemmon Survey	·	1.5 km	MPC · JPL
527066	2007 RW_{327}	—	September 12, 2007	Mount Lemmon	Mount Lemmon Survey	·	2.2 km	MPC · JPL
527067	2007 RX_{327}	—	September 7, 1996	Kitt Peak	Spacewatch	·	2.2 km	MPC · JPL
527068	2007 RY_{327}	—	September 13, 2007	Mount Lemmon	Mount Lemmon Survey	·	710 m	MPC · JPL
527069	2007 RC_{328}	—	September 15, 2007	Mount Lemmon	Mount Lemmon Survey	·	2.0 km	MPC · JPL
527070	2007 RD_{328}	—	September 13, 2007	Mount Lemmon	Mount Lemmon Survey	·	1.6 km	MPC · JPL
527071	2007 RJ_{328}	—	September 11, 2007	Mount Lemmon	Mount Lemmon Survey	·	1.4 km	MPC · JPL
527072	2007 RK_{328}	—	August 10, 2007	Kitt Peak	Spacewatch	·	1.3 km	MPC · JPL
527073	2007 RQ_{328}	—	September 13, 2007	Kitt Peak	Spacewatch	·	1.7 km	MPC · JPL
527074	2007 RC_{329}	—	September 14, 2007	Mount Lemmon	Mount Lemmon Survey	·	760 m	MPC · JPL
527075	2007 RE_{329}	—	January 21, 2004	Socorro	LINEAR	·	2.7 km	MPC · JPL
527076	2007 RF_{329}	—	September 11, 2007	Kitt Peak	Spacewatch	·	550 m	MPC · JPL
527077	2007 RJ_{329}	—	April 4, 2003	Kitt Peak	Spacewatch	·	630 m	MPC · JPL
527078	2007 RN_{329}	—	September 3, 2007	Catalina	CSS	·	620 m	MPC · JPL
527079	2007 RT_{329}	—	September 8, 2007	Mount Lemmon	Mount Lemmon Survey	·	820 m	MPC · JPL
527080	2007 RZ_{329}	—	September 10, 2007	Mount Lemmon	Mount Lemmon Survey	AGN	1.2 km	MPC · JPL
527081	2007 RF_{330}	—	August 12, 2007	XuYi	PMO NEO Survey Program	H	540 m	MPC · JPL
527082	2007 RP_{330}	—	September 12, 2007	Catalina	CSS	·	830 m	MPC · JPL
527083	2007 RV_{330}	—	September 12, 2007	Mount Lemmon	Mount Lemmon Survey	·	550 m	MPC · JPL
527084	2007 RD_{331}	—	September 12, 2007	Mount Lemmon	Mount Lemmon Survey	·	600 m	MPC · JPL
527085	2007 RG_{331}	—	September 12, 2007	Mount Lemmon	Mount Lemmon Survey	·	780 m	MPC · JPL
527086	2007 RJ_{331}	—	September 12, 2007	Mount Lemmon	Mount Lemmon Survey	·	1.8 km	MPC · JPL
527087	2007 RM_{331}	—	September 13, 2007	Catalina	CSS	·	2.0 km	MPC · JPL
527088	2007 RN_{331}	—	September 13, 2007	Catalina	CSS	·	700 m	MPC · JPL
527089	2007 RE_{332}	—	September 14, 2007	Mount Lemmon	Mount Lemmon Survey	·	1.6 km	MPC · JPL
527090	2007 RG_{332}	—	September 14, 2007	Mount Lemmon	Mount Lemmon Survey	·	710 m	MPC · JPL
527091	2007 RL_{332}	—	September 14, 2007	Catalina	CSS	V	530 m	MPC · JPL
527092	2007 RN_{332}	—	September 14, 2007	Mount Lemmon	Mount Lemmon Survey	·	540 m	MPC · JPL
527093	2007 RO_{332}	—	September 14, 2007	Mount Lemmon	Mount Lemmon Survey	·	1.7 km	MPC · JPL
527094	2007 SN_{3}	—	September 12, 2007	Catalina	CSS	PHO	950 m	MPC · JPL
527095	2007 ST_{3}	—	September 9, 2007	Anderson Mesa	LONEOS	PHO	770 m	MPC · JPL
527096	2007 SZ_{3}	—	September 16, 2007	Socorro	LINEAR	T_{j} (2.97)	3.2 km	MPC · JPL
527097	2007 SG_{8}	—	September 18, 2007	Kitt Peak	Spacewatch	·	880 m	MPC · JPL
527098	2007 ST_{8}	—	September 18, 2007	Kitt Peak	Spacewatch	·	620 m	MPC · JPL
527099	2007 SW_{13}	—	September 19, 2007	Kitt Peak	Spacewatch	H	470 m	MPC · JPL
527100	2007 SJ_{16}	—	July 18, 2007	Mount Lemmon	Mount Lemmon Survey	·	1.1 km	MPC · JPL

== 527101–527200 ==
back to top

Designation			Discovery			Properties		Ref
Permanent	Provisional	Named after	Date	Site	Discoverer(s)	Category	Diam.	Ref
527101	2007 SV_{16}	—	September 30, 2007	Kitt Peak	Spacewatch	·	2.5 km	MPC · JPL
527102	2007 SC_{17}	—	September 30, 2007	Kitt Peak	Spacewatch	·	2.2 km	MPC · JPL
527103	2007 SM_{21}	—	September 20, 2007	Catalina	CSS	·	3.2 km	MPC · JPL
527104	2007 SA_{22}	—	September 21, 2007	XuYi	PMO NEO Survey Program	·	1.1 km	MPC · JPL
527105	2007 SG_{22}	—	September 25, 2007	Mount Lemmon	Mount Lemmon Survey	·	1.1 km	MPC · JPL
527106	2007 SW_{22}	—	September 20, 2007	Kitt Peak	Spacewatch	·	1.8 km	MPC · JPL
527107	2007 SN_{23}	—	September 19, 2007	Kitt Peak	Spacewatch	·	2.1 km	MPC · JPL
527108	2007 SS_{24}	—	September 25, 2007	Mount Lemmon	Mount Lemmon Survey	·	1.8 km	MPC · JPL
527109	2007 SW_{24}	—	September 18, 2007	Mount Lemmon	Mount Lemmon Survey	NYS	820 m	MPC · JPL
527110	2007 SX_{24}	—	September 19, 2007	Kitt Peak	Spacewatch	·	1.5 km	MPC · JPL
527111	2007 TP_{1}	—	October 3, 2007	Kitt Peak	Spacewatch	·	2.5 km	MPC · JPL
527112	2007 TS_{6}	—	October 6, 2007	La Sagra	OAM	·	3.0 km	MPC · JPL
527113	2007 TZ_{10}	—	October 8, 2007	Mount Lemmon	Mount Lemmon Survey	·	1.5 km	MPC · JPL
527114	2007 TH_{13}	—	October 8, 2007	Kitt Peak	Spacewatch	H	480 m	MPC · JPL
527115	2007 TD_{14}	—	October 8, 2007	Mount Lemmon	Mount Lemmon Survey	AMO	570 m	MPC · JPL
527116	2007 TU_{20}	—	October 9, 2007	Altschwendt	W. Ries	·	1.8 km	MPC · JPL
527117	2007 TZ_{20}	—	September 5, 2007	Catalina	CSS	·	1.5 km	MPC · JPL
527118	2007 TS_{21}	—	October 4, 2007	Catalina	CSS	·	5.0 km	MPC · JPL
527119	2007 TN_{24}	—	September 20, 2007	Kitt Peak	Spacewatch	·	1.4 km	MPC · JPL
527120	2007 TE_{28}	—	October 4, 2007	Kitt Peak	Spacewatch	THM	2.0 km	MPC · JPL
527121	2007 TH_{28}	—	October 4, 2007	Kitt Peak	Spacewatch	·	2.8 km	MPC · JPL
527122	2007 TO_{28}	—	October 4, 2007	Kitt Peak	Spacewatch	·	1.8 km	MPC · JPL
527123	2007 TC_{31}	—	October 4, 2007	Kitt Peak	Spacewatch	·	1.1 km	MPC · JPL
527124	2007 TJ_{32}	—	October 6, 2007	Kitt Peak	Spacewatch	·	2.0 km	MPC · JPL
527125	2007 TB_{39}	—	October 6, 2007	Kitt Peak	Spacewatch	MAS	530 m	MPC · JPL
527126	2007 TF_{39}	—	September 15, 2007	Mount Lemmon	Mount Lemmon Survey	MAS	730 m	MPC · JPL
527127	2007 TT_{40}	—	September 12, 2007	Mount Lemmon	Mount Lemmon Survey	(2076)	680 m	MPC · JPL
527128	2007 TP_{43}	—	September 25, 2006	Mount Lemmon	Mount Lemmon Survey	3:2	5.3 km	MPC · JPL
527129	2007 TA_{45}	—	October 7, 2007	Catalina	CSS	·	1.7 km	MPC · JPL
527130	2007 TE_{49}	—	September 14, 2007	Mount Lemmon	Mount Lemmon Survey	·	2.1 km	MPC · JPL
527131	2007 TT_{49}	—	October 4, 2007	Kitt Peak	Spacewatch	·	900 m	MPC · JPL
527132	2007 TE_{50}	—	October 4, 2007	Kitt Peak	Spacewatch	·	990 m	MPC · JPL
527133	2007 TK_{50}	—	October 4, 2007	Kitt Peak	Spacewatch	·	940 m	MPC · JPL
527134	2007 TP_{52}	—	October 4, 2007	Kitt Peak	Spacewatch	MAS	470 m	MPC · JPL
527135	2007 TD_{53}	—	October 4, 2007	Kitt Peak	Spacewatch	·	1.9 km	MPC · JPL
527136	2007 TV_{55}	—	October 4, 2007	Kitt Peak	Spacewatch	·	1.1 km	MPC · JPL
527137	2007 TM_{58}	—	October 4, 2007	Kitt Peak	Spacewatch	·	2.0 km	MPC · JPL
527138	2007 TQ_{60}	—	August 24, 2007	Kitt Peak	Spacewatch	EUN	1.0 km	MPC · JPL
527139	2007 TX_{60}	—	October 6, 2007	Kitt Peak	Spacewatch	·	3.0 km	MPC · JPL
527140	2007 TY_{61}	—	September 8, 2007	Mount Lemmon	Mount Lemmon Survey	·	830 m	MPC · JPL
527141	2007 TV_{62}	—	October 7, 2007	Mount Lemmon	Mount Lemmon Survey	·	750 m	MPC · JPL
527142	2007 TG_{63}	—	October 7, 2007	Mount Lemmon	Mount Lemmon Survey	NYS	680 m	MPC · JPL
527143	2007 TT_{75}	—	September 14, 2007	Mount Lemmon	Mount Lemmon Survey	·	2.4 km	MPC · JPL
527144	2007 TF_{76}	—	October 5, 2007	Kitt Peak	Spacewatch	NYS	660 m	MPC · JPL
527145	2007 TA_{77}	—	October 5, 2007	Kitt Peak	Spacewatch	·	1.1 km	MPC · JPL
527146	2007 TD_{77}	—	October 5, 2007	Kitt Peak	Spacewatch	·	610 m	MPC · JPL
527147	2007 TJ_{77}	—	October 5, 2007	Kitt Peak	Spacewatch	·	2.6 km	MPC · JPL
527148	2007 TU_{77}	—	September 25, 2007	Mount Lemmon	Mount Lemmon Survey	·	1.0 km	MPC · JPL
527149	2007 TW_{78}	—	October 5, 2007	Kitt Peak	Spacewatch	TIR	2.2 km	MPC · JPL
527150	2007 TF_{79}	—	October 5, 2007	Kitt Peak	Spacewatch	·	1.0 km	MPC · JPL
527151	2007 TD_{81}	—	October 7, 2007	Mount Lemmon	Mount Lemmon Survey	·	1.4 km	MPC · JPL
527152	2007 TW_{82}	—	October 8, 2007	Catalina	CSS	·	5.8 km	MPC · JPL
527153	2007 TS_{86}	—	October 8, 2007	Mount Lemmon	Mount Lemmon Survey	·	2.9 km	MPC · JPL
527154	2007 TQ_{88}	—	September 14, 2007	Mount Lemmon	Mount Lemmon Survey	·	1.0 km	MPC · JPL
527155	2007 TS_{89}	—	October 8, 2007	Mount Lemmon	Mount Lemmon Survey	·	2.5 km	MPC · JPL
527156	2007 TH_{90}	—	October 8, 2007	Mount Lemmon	Mount Lemmon Survey	·	790 m	MPC · JPL
527157	2007 TO_{91}	—	September 11, 2007	Mount Lemmon	Mount Lemmon Survey	·	1.8 km	MPC · JPL
527158	2007 TN_{92}	—	October 5, 2007	Kitt Peak	Spacewatch	·	1.6 km	MPC · JPL
527159	2007 TG_{100}	—	September 20, 2007	Kitt Peak	Spacewatch	NYS	690 m	MPC · JPL
527160	2007 TS_{103}	—	October 8, 2007	Mount Lemmon	Mount Lemmon Survey	·	2.7 km	MPC · JPL
527161	2007 TL_{104}	—	October 8, 2007	Mount Lemmon	Mount Lemmon Survey	·	1.2 km	MPC · JPL
527162	2007 TR_{104}	—	October 8, 2007	Mount Lemmon	Mount Lemmon Survey	NYS	820 m	MPC · JPL
527163	2007 TW_{105}	—	September 13, 2007	Mount Lemmon	Mount Lemmon Survey	·	2.1 km	MPC · JPL
527164	2007 TL_{106}	—	August 13, 2007	XuYi	PMO NEO Survey Program	·	940 m	MPC · JPL
527165	2007 TC_{108}	—	April 11, 2005	Kitt Peak	Spacewatch	·	3.6 km	MPC · JPL
527166	2007 TG_{109}	—	October 7, 2007	Catalina	CSS	·	1.3 km	MPC · JPL
527167	2007 TR_{111}	—	October 8, 2007	Catalina	CSS	·	1.0 km	MPC · JPL
527168	2007 TC_{114}	—	October 8, 1993	Kitt Peak	Spacewatch	·	690 m	MPC · JPL
527169	2007 TW_{115}	—	October 8, 2007	Mount Lemmon	Mount Lemmon Survey	·	2.1 km	MPC · JPL
527170	2007 TY_{116}	—	October 9, 2007	Anderson Mesa	LONEOS	·	2.2 km	MPC · JPL
527171	2007 TN_{120}	—	October 9, 2007	Kitt Peak	Spacewatch	·	1.6 km	MPC · JPL
527172	2007 TQ_{122}	—	October 6, 2007	Kitt Peak	Spacewatch	·	2.3 km	MPC · JPL
527173	2007 TF_{123}	—	September 15, 2007	Mount Lemmon	Mount Lemmon Survey	NYS	800 m	MPC · JPL
527174	2007 TR_{123}	—	October 6, 2007	Kitt Peak	Spacewatch	MAS	680 m	MPC · JPL
527175	2007 TU_{128}	—	June 23, 1995	Kitt Peak	Spacewatch	·	2.5 km	MPC · JPL
527176	2007 TW_{128}	—	October 6, 2007	Kitt Peak	Spacewatch	·	940 m	MPC · JPL
527177	2007 TX_{128}	—	September 13, 2007	Mount Lemmon	Mount Lemmon Survey	·	650 m	MPC · JPL
527178	2007 TY_{128}	—	October 6, 2007	Kitt Peak	Spacewatch	·	2.6 km	MPC · JPL
527179	2007 TV_{129}	—	October 6, 2007	Kitt Peak	Spacewatch	·	550 m	MPC · JPL
527180	2007 TA_{130}	—	September 15, 2007	Mount Lemmon	Mount Lemmon Survey	MAS	540 m	MPC · JPL
527181	2007 TX_{131}	—	October 7, 2007	Mount Lemmon	Mount Lemmon Survey	·	2.7 km	MPC · JPL
527182	2007 TY_{132}	—	October 7, 2007	Mount Lemmon	Mount Lemmon Survey	THM	1.9 km	MPC · JPL
527183	2007 TV_{133}	—	October 7, 2007	Mount Lemmon	Mount Lemmon Survey	EUP	2.9 km	MPC · JPL
527184	2007 TK_{134}	—	October 7, 2007	Mount Lemmon	Mount Lemmon Survey	·	2.0 km	MPC · JPL
527185	2007 TE_{135}	—	September 12, 2007	Catalina	CSS	·	1.4 km	MPC · JPL
527186	2007 TS_{135}	—	September 30, 2007	Kitt Peak	Spacewatch	·	1.7 km	MPC · JPL
527187	2007 TT_{139}	—	October 9, 2007	Catalina	CSS	·	2.1 km	MPC · JPL
527188	2007 TD_{140}	—	October 9, 2007	Catalina	CSS	·	1.6 km	MPC · JPL
527189	2007 TO_{140}	—	October 9, 2007	Mount Lemmon	Mount Lemmon Survey	MAS	540 m	MPC · JPL
527190	2007 TV_{149}	—	October 9, 2007	Socorro	LINEAR	H	500 m	MPC · JPL
527191	2007 TD_{152}	—	October 7, 2007	Catalina	CSS	·	1.4 km	MPC · JPL
527192	2007 TN_{158}	—	September 5, 2007	Mount Lemmon	Mount Lemmon Survey	·	2.5 km	MPC · JPL
527193	2007 TS_{161}	—	October 11, 2007	Catalina	CSS	·	2.5 km	MPC · JPL
527194	2007 TU_{161}	—	October 8, 2007	Mount Lemmon	Mount Lemmon Survey	·	1.9 km	MPC · JPL
527195	2007 TZ_{161}	—	September 11, 2007	Mount Lemmon	Mount Lemmon Survey	BRA	1.6 km	MPC · JPL
527196	2007 TA_{163}	—	October 9, 2007	Kitt Peak	Spacewatch	·	2.8 km	MPC · JPL
527197	2007 TJ_{164}	—	October 11, 2007	Socorro	LINEAR	·	2.3 km	MPC · JPL
527198	2007 TP_{164}	—	October 4, 2007	Kitt Peak	Spacewatch	·	830 m	MPC · JPL
527199	2007 TD_{167}	—	September 14, 2007	Mount Lemmon	Mount Lemmon Survey	MAS	670 m	MPC · JPL
527200	2007 TG_{170}	—	October 12, 2007	Socorro	LINEAR	·	2.2 km	MPC · JPL

== 527201–527300 ==
back to top

Designation			Discovery			Properties		Ref
Permanent	Provisional	Named after	Date	Site	Discoverer(s)	Category	Diam.	Ref
527201	2007 TL_{174}	—	September 13, 2007	Kitt Peak	Spacewatch	·	590 m	MPC · JPL
527202	2007 TQ_{174}	—	September 13, 2007	Mount Lemmon	Mount Lemmon Survey	·	620 m	MPC · JPL
527203	2007 TZ_{175}	—	October 5, 2007	Kitt Peak	Spacewatch	H	590 m	MPC · JPL
527204	2007 TL_{177}	—	October 6, 2007	Kitt Peak	Spacewatch	·	3.2 km	MPC · JPL
527205 Zhongdatianwen	2007 TL_{178}	Zhongdatianwen	October 7, 2007	Kitt Peak	Spacewatch	·	1.0 km	MPC · JPL
527206	2007 TY_{178}	—	October 7, 2007	Kitt Peak	Spacewatch	·	870 m	MPC · JPL
527207	2007 TO_{183}	—	October 9, 2007	Kitt Peak	Spacewatch	ERI	1.1 km	MPC · JPL
527208	2007 TS_{185}	—	September 13, 2007	Mount Lemmon	Mount Lemmon Survey	MAS	690 m	MPC · JPL
527209	2007 TV_{191}	—	October 4, 2007	Catalina	CSS	·	2.8 km	MPC · JPL
527210	2007 TP_{194}	—	September 8, 2007	Mount Lemmon	Mount Lemmon Survey	MAS	480 m	MPC · JPL
527211	2007 TG_{200}	—	October 8, 2007	Kitt Peak	Spacewatch	THM	1.6 km	MPC · JPL
527212	2007 TO_{200}	—	October 8, 2007	Kitt Peak	Spacewatch	·	820 m	MPC · JPL
527213	2007 TR_{200}	—	October 8, 2007	Kitt Peak	Spacewatch	·	2.2 km	MPC · JPL
527214	2007 TM_{203}	—	October 8, 2007	Mount Lemmon	Mount Lemmon Survey	·	2.1 km	MPC · JPL
527215	2007 TV_{204}	—	October 8, 2007	Mount Lemmon	Mount Lemmon Survey	·	900 m	MPC · JPL
527216	2007 TO_{208}	—	October 10, 2007	Catalina	CSS	·	1.9 km	MPC · JPL
527217	2007 TJ_{210}	—	October 5, 2007	Kitt Peak	Spacewatch	·	2.5 km	MPC · JPL
527218	2007 TS_{212}	—	September 25, 2007	Mount Lemmon	Mount Lemmon Survey	·	1.7 km	MPC · JPL
527219	2007 TO_{213}	—	October 7, 2007	Kitt Peak	Spacewatch	·	2.6 km	MPC · JPL
527220	2007 TC_{214}	—	October 7, 2007	Kitt Peak	Spacewatch	V	550 m	MPC · JPL
527221	2007 TQ_{214}	—	October 7, 2007	Catalina	CSS	·	3.5 km	MPC · JPL
527222	2007 TS_{216}	—	October 7, 2007	Kitt Peak	Spacewatch	·	560 m	MPC · JPL
527223	2007 TJ_{217}	—	October 7, 2007	Kitt Peak	Spacewatch	EOS	1.8 km	MPC · JPL
527224	2007 TK_{217}	—	October 7, 2007	Kitt Peak	Spacewatch	·	870 m	MPC · JPL
527225	2007 TX_{217}	—	October 7, 2007	Kitt Peak	Spacewatch	TIR	2.4 km	MPC · JPL
527226	2007 TJ_{225}	—	October 4, 2007	Kitt Peak	Spacewatch	·	850 m	MPC · JPL
527227	2007 TT_{230}	—	September 15, 2007	Mount Lemmon	Mount Lemmon Survey	·	2.4 km	MPC · JPL
527228	2007 TW_{233}	—	September 14, 2007	Mount Lemmon	Mount Lemmon Survey	·	1.3 km	MPC · JPL
527229	2007 TQ_{235}	—	October 9, 2007	Mount Lemmon	Mount Lemmon Survey	·	770 m	MPC · JPL
527230	2007 TO_{236}	—	September 11, 2007	Mount Lemmon	Mount Lemmon Survey	·	630 m	MPC · JPL
527231	2007 TS_{236}	—	October 9, 2007	Mount Lemmon	Mount Lemmon Survey	·	1.1 km	MPC · JPL
527232	2007 TG_{239}	—	October 10, 2007	Mount Lemmon	Mount Lemmon Survey	TIR	2.6 km	MPC · JPL
527233	2007 TH_{242}	—	October 8, 2007	Catalina	CSS	·	2.1 km	MPC · JPL
527234	2007 TQ_{246}	—	October 9, 2007	Mount Lemmon	Mount Lemmon Survey	·	1.4 km	MPC · JPL
527235	2007 TB_{249}	—	October 11, 2007	Mount Lemmon	Mount Lemmon Survey	·	900 m	MPC · JPL
527236	2007 TE_{249}	—	October 11, 2007	Mount Lemmon	Mount Lemmon Survey	·	460 m	MPC · JPL
527237	2007 TU_{252}	—	October 7, 2007	Mount Lemmon	Mount Lemmon Survey	·	880 m	MPC · JPL
527238	2007 TZ_{252}	—	October 8, 2007	Mount Lemmon	Mount Lemmon Survey	·	1.4 km	MPC · JPL
527239	2007 TC_{260}	—	October 10, 2007	Mount Lemmon	Mount Lemmon Survey	·	1.1 km	MPC · JPL
527240	2007 TK_{260}	—	October 10, 2007	Kitt Peak	Spacewatch	THM	2.0 km	MPC · JPL
527241	2007 TB_{262}	—	October 10, 2007	Kitt Peak	Spacewatch	·	1.9 km	MPC · JPL
527242	2007 TT_{262}	—	September 15, 2007	Mount Lemmon	Mount Lemmon Survey	·	2.6 km	MPC · JPL
527243	2007 TJ_{265}	—	October 11, 2007	Kitt Peak	Spacewatch	·	1.1 km	MPC · JPL
527244	2007 TZ_{267}	—	September 5, 2007	Mount Lemmon	Mount Lemmon Survey	·	660 m	MPC · JPL
527245	2007 TN_{268}	—	September 11, 2007	Mount Lemmon	Mount Lemmon Survey	THM	1.7 km	MPC · JPL
527246	2007 TX_{272}	—	October 9, 2007	Kitt Peak	Spacewatch	·	760 m	MPC · JPL
527247	2007 TE_{275}	—	April 2, 2005	Kitt Peak	Spacewatch	·	3.1 km	MPC · JPL
527248	2007 TE_{278}	—	September 14, 2007	Mount Lemmon	Mount Lemmon Survey	·	1.2 km	MPC · JPL
527249	2007 TL_{278}	—	October 11, 2007	Mount Lemmon	Mount Lemmon Survey	EOS	1.6 km	MPC · JPL
527250	2007 TK_{280}	—	September 9, 2007	Kitt Peak	Spacewatch	3:2	4.9 km	MPC · JPL
527251	2007 TP_{280}	—	September 11, 2007	Kitt Peak	Spacewatch	·	1.9 km	MPC · JPL
527252	2007 TS_{283}	—	September 12, 2007	Mount Lemmon	Mount Lemmon Survey	MAS	530 m	MPC · JPL
527253	2007 TK_{284}	—	September 12, 2007	Mount Lemmon	Mount Lemmon Survey	·	2.0 km	MPC · JPL
527254	2007 TH_{288}	—	October 11, 2007	Catalina	CSS	·	1.4 km	MPC · JPL
527255	2007 TY_{291}	—	September 9, 2007	Kitt Peak	Spacewatch	·	2.3 km	MPC · JPL
527256	2007 TM_{295}	—	October 10, 2007	Mount Lemmon	Mount Lemmon Survey	·	1.8 km	MPC · JPL
527257	2007 TX_{295}	—	September 13, 2007	Mount Lemmon	Mount Lemmon Survey	·	2.2 km	MPC · JPL
527258	2007 TQ_{296}	—	October 10, 2007	Mount Lemmon	Mount Lemmon Survey	·	780 m	MPC · JPL
527259	2007 TG_{300}	—	October 4, 2007	Kitt Peak	Spacewatch	CLA	1.5 km	MPC · JPL
527260	2007 TM_{301}	—	October 12, 2007	Kitt Peak	Spacewatch	GEF	1.1 km	MPC · JPL
527261	2007 TG_{302}	—	October 12, 2007	Kitt Peak	Spacewatch	·	930 m	MPC · JPL
527262	2007 TF_{303}	—	October 12, 2007	Kitt Peak	Spacewatch	·	730 m	MPC · JPL
527263	2007 TP_{303}	—	September 9, 2007	Mount Lemmon	Mount Lemmon Survey	THM	1.8 km	MPC · JPL
527264	2007 TL_{307}	—	September 14, 2007	Mount Lemmon	Mount Lemmon Survey	·	1.6 km	MPC · JPL
527265	2007 TB_{308}	—	October 9, 2007	Mount Lemmon	Mount Lemmon Survey	NYS	900 m	MPC · JPL
527266	2007 TU_{312}	—	September 14, 2007	Mount Lemmon	Mount Lemmon Survey	·	1.6 km	MPC · JPL
527267	2007 TO_{315}	—	October 4, 2007	Kitt Peak	Spacewatch	·	2.0 km	MPC · JPL
527268	2007 TO_{316}	—	October 12, 2007	Kitt Peak	Spacewatch	HYG	2.5 km	MPC · JPL
527269	2007 TP_{318}	—	October 12, 2007	Kitt Peak	Spacewatch	EOS	1.6 km	MPC · JPL
527270	2007 TA_{323}	—	September 25, 2007	Mount Lemmon	Mount Lemmon Survey	V	500 m	MPC · JPL
527271	2007 TC_{323}	—	September 25, 2007	Mount Lemmon	Mount Lemmon Survey	·	2.8 km	MPC · JPL
527272	2007 TK_{328}	—	October 11, 2007	Kitt Peak	Spacewatch	·	610 m	MPC · JPL
527273	2007 TU_{329}	—	October 11, 2007	Kitt Peak	Spacewatch	HYG	2.1 km	MPC · JPL
527274	2007 TB_{330}	—	June 22, 2006	Kitt Peak	Spacewatch	·	3.0 km	MPC · JPL
527275	2007 TB_{331}	—	October 11, 2007	Kitt Peak	Spacewatch	·	600 m	MPC · JPL
527276	2007 TN_{333}	—	October 11, 2007	Kitt Peak	Spacewatch	MAS	680 m	MPC · JPL
527277	2007 TA_{334}	—	October 11, 2007	Kitt Peak	Spacewatch	·	770 m	MPC · JPL
527278	2007 TQ_{335}	—	October 11, 2007	Kitt Peak	Spacewatch	·	1.9 km	MPC · JPL
527279	2007 TE_{337}	—	September 12, 2007	Mount Lemmon	Mount Lemmon Survey	·	1.5 km	MPC · JPL
527280	2007 TR_{344}	—	October 10, 2007	Mount Lemmon	Mount Lemmon Survey	HOF	2.6 km	MPC · JPL
527281	2007 TL_{345}	—	September 12, 2007	Catalina	CSS	·	870 m	MPC · JPL
527282	2007 TV_{346}	—	October 13, 2007	Mount Lemmon	Mount Lemmon Survey	·	2.9 km	MPC · JPL
527283	2007 TA_{347}	—	October 13, 2007	Mount Lemmon	Mount Lemmon Survey	·	2.2 km	MPC · JPL
527284	2007 TV_{353}	—	October 9, 2007	Mount Lemmon	Mount Lemmon Survey	·	670 m	MPC · JPL
527285	2007 TW_{354}	—	September 8, 2007	Mount Lemmon	Mount Lemmon Survey	·	1.8 km	MPC · JPL
527286	2007 TY_{357}	—	October 15, 2007	Mount Lemmon	Mount Lemmon Survey	·	1.4 km	MPC · JPL
527287	2007 TB_{361}	—	October 15, 2007	Mount Lemmon	Mount Lemmon Survey	·	770 m	MPC · JPL
527288	2007 TP_{361}	—	October 15, 2007	Mount Lemmon	Mount Lemmon Survey	·	1.7 km	MPC · JPL
527289	2007 TM_{363}	—	October 15, 2007	Mount Lemmon	Mount Lemmon Survey	·	2.8 km	MPC · JPL
527290	2007 TX_{366}	—	October 9, 2007	Kitt Peak	Spacewatch	·	910 m	MPC · JPL
527291	2007 TV_{367}	—	September 10, 2007	Mount Lemmon	Mount Lemmon Survey	PAD	1.5 km	MPC · JPL
527292	2007 TB_{370}	—	September 15, 2007	Mount Lemmon	Mount Lemmon Survey	·	630 m	MPC · JPL
527293	2007 TQ_{371}	—	September 15, 2007	Anderson Mesa	LONEOS	·	780 m	MPC · JPL
527294	2007 TR_{371}	—	September 15, 2007	Kitt Peak	Spacewatch	·	840 m	MPC · JPL
527295	2007 TV_{372}	—	October 14, 2007	Mount Lemmon	Mount Lemmon Survey	H	460 m	MPC · JPL
527296	2007 TA_{374}	—	October 14, 2007	Mount Lemmon	Mount Lemmon Survey	·	720 m	MPC · JPL
527297	2007 TG_{375}	—	October 15, 2007	Mount Lemmon	Mount Lemmon Survey	·	1.3 km	MPC · JPL
527298	2007 TE_{376}	—	October 15, 2007	Kitt Peak	Spacewatch	·	2.1 km	MPC · JPL
527299	2007 TD_{377}	—	September 12, 2007	Catalina	CSS	·	670 m	MPC · JPL
527300	2007 TE_{381}	—	October 14, 2007	Kitt Peak	Spacewatch	MAS	490 m	MPC · JPL

== 527301–527400 ==
back to top

Designation			Discovery			Properties		Ref
Permanent	Provisional	Named after	Date	Site	Discoverer(s)	Category	Diam.	Ref
527301	2007 TA_{382}	—	October 14, 2007	Kitt Peak	Spacewatch	·	1.9 km	MPC · JPL
527302	2007 TP_{382}	—	October 14, 2007	Kitt Peak	Spacewatch	HYG	2.1 km	MPC · JPL
527303	2007 TT_{384}	—	October 14, 2007	Mount Lemmon	Mount Lemmon Survey	·	3.3 km	MPC · JPL
527304	2007 TV_{384}	—	October 14, 2007	Mount Lemmon	Mount Lemmon Survey	·	3.0 km	MPC · JPL
527305	2007 TG_{385}	—	October 4, 2007	Catalina	CSS	·	630 m	MPC · JPL
527306	2007 TQ_{385}	—	September 5, 2007	Mount Lemmon	Mount Lemmon Survey	·	2.5 km	MPC · JPL
527307	2007 TB_{388}	—	October 13, 2007	Mount Lemmon	Mount Lemmon Survey	MAS	490 m	MPC · JPL
527308	2007 TM_{388}	—	October 13, 2007	Mount Lemmon	Mount Lemmon Survey	·	3.8 km	MPC · JPL
527309	2007 TT_{389}	—	October 13, 2007	Kitt Peak	Spacewatch	·	2.2 km	MPC · JPL
527310	2007 TW_{390}	—	October 14, 2007	Mount Lemmon	Mount Lemmon Survey	·	2.1 km	MPC · JPL
527311	2007 TA_{394}	—	September 15, 2007	Mount Lemmon	Mount Lemmon Survey	·	660 m	MPC · JPL
527312	2007 TF_{394}	—	September 9, 2007	Mount Lemmon	Mount Lemmon Survey	THM	1.8 km	MPC · JPL
527313	2007 TW_{396}	—	October 11, 2007	Kitt Peak	Spacewatch	·	770 m	MPC · JPL
527314	2007 TT_{397}	—	October 15, 2007	Kitt Peak	Spacewatch	·	1.4 km	MPC · JPL
527315	2007 TX_{399}	—	September 12, 2007	Mount Lemmon	Mount Lemmon Survey	·	930 m	MPC · JPL
527316	2007 TE_{400}	—	October 15, 2007	Catalina	CSS	TIR	2.3 km	MPC · JPL
527317	2007 TZ_{400}	—	October 14, 2007	Mount Lemmon	Mount Lemmon Survey	·	2.5 km	MPC · JPL
527318	2007 TZ_{402}	—	October 15, 2007	Kitt Peak	Spacewatch	·	1.1 km	MPC · JPL
527319	2007 TR_{403}	—	October 15, 2007	Kitt Peak	Spacewatch	·	2.7 km	MPC · JPL
527320	2007 TV_{404}	—	October 15, 2007	Kitt Peak	Spacewatch	·	2.0 km	MPC · JPL
527321	2007 TS_{405}	—	September 10, 2007	Mount Lemmon	Mount Lemmon Survey	·	1.2 km	MPC · JPL
527322	2007 TR_{407}	—	October 6, 2007	Kitt Peak	Spacewatch	·	830 m	MPC · JPL
527323	2007 TA_{410}	—	October 15, 2007	Kitt Peak	Spacewatch	·	2.3 km	MPC · JPL
527324	2007 TR_{411}	—	September 13, 2007	Mount Lemmon	Mount Lemmon Survey	·	910 m	MPC · JPL
527325	2007 TB_{413}	—	September 8, 2007	Anderson Mesa	LONEOS	T_{j} (2.96)	3.6 km	MPC · JPL
527326	2007 TE_{414}	—	September 25, 2007	Mount Lemmon	Mount Lemmon Survey	MAS	600 m	MPC · JPL
527327	2007 TT_{414}	—	October 15, 2007	Kitt Peak	Spacewatch	H	380 m	MPC · JPL
527328	2007 TK_{422}	—	October 6, 2007	Apache Point	A. C. Becker, Puckett, A. W., Kubica, J.	centaur	80 km	MPC · JPL
527329	2007 TA_{423}	—	October 15, 2007	Mount Lemmon	Mount Lemmon Survey	·	1.9 km	MPC · JPL
527330	2007 TB_{423}	—	October 4, 2007	Kitt Peak	Spacewatch	THM	1.9 km	MPC · JPL
527331	2007 TG_{423}	—	October 4, 2007	Kitt Peak	Spacewatch	V	590 m	MPC · JPL
527332	2007 TN_{423}	—	October 4, 2007	Kitt Peak	Spacewatch	·	940 m	MPC · JPL
527333	2007 TL_{424}	—	September 13, 2007	Mount Lemmon	Mount Lemmon Survey	·	900 m	MPC · JPL
527334	2007 TN_{424}	—	October 8, 2007	Kitt Peak	Spacewatch	·	970 m	MPC · JPL
527335	2007 TZ_{425}	—	October 9, 2007	Kitt Peak	Spacewatch	ERI	940 m	MPC · JPL
527336	2007 TN_{426}	—	October 9, 2007	Kitt Peak	Spacewatch	·	2.3 km	MPC · JPL
527337	2007 TY_{426}	—	October 9, 2007	Kitt Peak	Spacewatch	·	1.9 km	MPC · JPL
527338	2007 TJ_{429}	—	October 12, 2007	Kitt Peak	Spacewatch	·	730 m	MPC · JPL
527339	2007 TY_{429}	—	October 14, 2007	Mount Lemmon	Mount Lemmon Survey	·	2.4 km	MPC · JPL
527340	2007 TD_{430}	—	October 12, 2007	Mount Lemmon	Mount Lemmon Survey	·	800 m	MPC · JPL
527341	2007 TV_{434}	—	October 11, 2007	Catalina	CSS	·	1.4 km	MPC · JPL
527342	2007 TD_{438}	—	October 12, 2007	Kitt Peak	Spacewatch	·	1.7 km	MPC · JPL
527343	2007 TK_{438}	—	September 12, 2007	Mount Lemmon	Mount Lemmon Survey	EOS	1.8 km	MPC · JPL
527344	2007 TW_{440}	—	October 8, 2007	Catalina	CSS	·	2.2 km	MPC · JPL
527345	2007 TH_{441}	—	October 8, 2007	Catalina	CSS	·	3.0 km	MPC · JPL
527346	2007 TU_{441}	—	October 8, 2007	Catalina	CSS	TIR	2.9 km	MPC · JPL
527347	2007 TN_{442}	—	October 8, 2007	Catalina	CSS	·	2.5 km	MPC · JPL
527348	2007 TG_{444}	—	October 7, 2007	Catalina	CSS	PHO	720 m	MPC · JPL
527349	2007 TK_{444}	—	October 8, 2007	Catalina	CSS	·	710 m	MPC · JPL
527350	2007 TK_{445}	—	October 5, 2007	Kitt Peak	Spacewatch	·	2.6 km	MPC · JPL
527351	2007 TB_{447}	—	October 10, 2007	Anderson Mesa	LONEOS	·	2.9 km	MPC · JPL
527352	2007 TF_{448}	—	October 6, 2007	Kitt Peak	Spacewatch	·	1.9 km	MPC · JPL
527353	2007 TH_{448}	—	October 7, 2007	Kitt Peak	Spacewatch	EOS	1.8 km	MPC · JPL
527354	2007 TO_{449}	—	October 10, 2007	Kitt Peak	Spacewatch	MAS	590 m	MPC · JPL
527355	2007 TE_{450}	—	October 11, 2007	Kitt Peak	Spacewatch	LIX	2.9 km	MPC · JPL
527356	2007 TO_{451}	—	October 7, 2007	Kitt Peak	Spacewatch	·	980 m	MPC · JPL
527357	2007 TS_{452}	—	October 12, 2007	Mount Lemmon	Mount Lemmon Survey	·	3.0 km	MPC · JPL
527358	2007 TH_{455}	—	October 14, 2007	Mount Lemmon	Mount Lemmon Survey	AGN	1.0 km	MPC · JPL
527359	2007 TS_{455}	—	October 11, 2007	Kitt Peak	Spacewatch	EOS	1.8 km	MPC · JPL
527360	2007 TC_{456}	—	October 9, 2007	Kitt Peak	Spacewatch	BRA	1.1 km	MPC · JPL
527361	2007 TG_{456}	—	May 3, 2006	Mount Lemmon	Mount Lemmon Survey	·	650 m	MPC · JPL
527362	2007 TH_{456}	—	October 14, 2007	Mount Lemmon	Mount Lemmon Survey	·	680 m	MPC · JPL
527363	2007 TJ_{456}	—	October 14, 2007	Mount Lemmon	Mount Lemmon Survey	·	750 m	MPC · JPL
527364	2007 TK_{456}	—	October 15, 2007	Mount Lemmon	Mount Lemmon Survey	·	680 m	MPC · JPL
527365	2007 TL_{456}	—	October 4, 2007	Catalina	CSS	·	680 m	MPC · JPL
527366	2007 TN_{456}	—	October 4, 2007	Mount Lemmon	Mount Lemmon Survey	THM	1.9 km	MPC · JPL
527367	2007 TZ_{456}	—	October 8, 2007	Mount Lemmon	Mount Lemmon Survey	KOR	1.3 km	MPC · JPL
527368	2007 TA_{457}	—	October 8, 2007	Mount Lemmon	Mount Lemmon Survey	·	1.9 km	MPC · JPL
527369	2007 TH_{457}	—	October 8, 2007	Mount Lemmon	Mount Lemmon Survey	EOS	1.4 km	MPC · JPL
527370	2007 TK_{457}	—	October 9, 2007	Mount Lemmon	Mount Lemmon Survey	EOS	1.5 km	MPC · JPL
527371	2007 TL_{457}	—	October 9, 2007	Catalina	CSS	·	1.5 km	MPC · JPL
527372	2007 TQ_{457}	—	October 9, 2007	Kitt Peak	Spacewatch	·	1.8 km	MPC · JPL
527373	2007 TS_{457}	—	October 10, 2007	Mount Lemmon	Mount Lemmon Survey	·	1.9 km	MPC · JPL
527374	2007 TX_{457}	—	October 10, 2007	Catalina	CSS	·	1.9 km	MPC · JPL
527375	2007 TE_{458}	—	October 10, 2007	Mount Lemmon	Mount Lemmon Survey	·	2.4 km	MPC · JPL
527376	2007 TG_{458}	—	October 10, 2007	Mount Lemmon	Mount Lemmon Survey	·	1.4 km	MPC · JPL
527377	2007 TJ_{458}	—	October 11, 2007	Mount Lemmon	Mount Lemmon Survey	·	780 m	MPC · JPL
527378	2007 TL_{458}	—	October 12, 2007	Mount Lemmon	Mount Lemmon Survey	·	830 m	MPC · JPL
527379	2007 TP_{458}	—	October 12, 2007	Mount Lemmon	Mount Lemmon Survey	·	2.0 km	MPC · JPL
527380	2007 TQ_{458}	—	October 12, 2007	Mount Lemmon	Mount Lemmon Survey	·	750 m	MPC · JPL
527381	2007 TR_{458}	—	October 12, 2007	Mount Lemmon	Mount Lemmon Survey	·	2.2 km	MPC · JPL
527382	2007 TS_{458}	—	October 12, 2007	Mount Lemmon	Mount Lemmon Survey	·	1.6 km	MPC · JPL
527383	2007 TT_{458}	—	October 12, 2007	Mount Lemmon	Mount Lemmon Survey	·	550 m	MPC · JPL
527384	2007 TU_{458}	—	October 13, 2007	Mount Lemmon	Mount Lemmon Survey	·	590 m	MPC · JPL
527385	2007 TW_{458}	—	October 14, 2007	Mount Lemmon	Mount Lemmon Survey	KOR	1.3 km	MPC · JPL
527386	2007 TC_{459}	—	October 15, 2007	Mount Lemmon	Mount Lemmon Survey	·	1.7 km	MPC · JPL
527387	2007 TK_{459}	—	October 15, 2007	Mount Lemmon	Mount Lemmon Survey	·	1.8 km	MPC · JPL
527388	2007 TM_{459}	—	October 15, 2007	Mount Lemmon	Mount Lemmon Survey	EOS	1.4 km	MPC · JPL
527389	2007 UJ_{7}	—	October 9, 2007	Catalina	CSS	·	3.8 km	MPC · JPL
527390	2007 UV_{7}	—	October 9, 2007	Catalina	CSS	·	2.8 km	MPC · JPL
527391	2007 UH_{11}	—	October 10, 2007	Mount Lemmon	Mount Lemmon Survey	NYS	1.2 km	MPC · JPL
527392	2007 UL_{13}	—	October 16, 2007	Catalina	CSS	TIR	2.2 km	MPC · JPL
527393	2007 UF_{20}	—	October 18, 2007	Mount Lemmon	Mount Lemmon Survey	EOS	1.5 km	MPC · JPL
527394	2007 UG_{20}	—	October 8, 2007	Mount Lemmon	Mount Lemmon Survey	·	1.4 km	MPC · JPL
527395	2007 UB_{22}	—	October 16, 2007	Kitt Peak	Spacewatch	·	510 m	MPC · JPL
527396	2007 UV_{28}	—	September 9, 2007	Mount Lemmon	Mount Lemmon Survey	·	570 m	MPC · JPL
527397	2007 UV_{29}	—	October 19, 2007	Kitt Peak	Spacewatch	·	810 m	MPC · JPL
527398	2007 UQ_{34}	—	October 18, 2007	Anderson Mesa	LONEOS	·	1.3 km	MPC · JPL
527399	2007 UR_{34}	—	October 18, 2007	Kitt Peak	Spacewatch	·	2.8 km	MPC · JPL
527400	2007 UF_{39}	—	October 20, 2007	Catalina	CSS	H	420 m	MPC · JPL

== 527401–527500 ==
back to top

Designation			Discovery			Properties		Ref
Permanent	Provisional	Named after	Date	Site	Discoverer(s)	Category	Diam.	Ref
527401	2007 UU_{43}	—	October 9, 2007	Mount Lemmon	Mount Lemmon Survey	·	3.1 km	MPC · JPL
527402	2007 UV_{45}	—	September 25, 2007	Mount Lemmon	Mount Lemmon Survey	·	2.0 km	MPC · JPL
527403	2007 UH_{46}	—	September 25, 2007	Mount Lemmon	Mount Lemmon Survey	·	660 m	MPC · JPL
527404	2007 UE_{51}	—	October 24, 2007	Mount Lemmon	Mount Lemmon Survey	·	890 m	MPC · JPL
527405	2007 UW_{53}	—	October 30, 2007	Kitt Peak	Spacewatch	·	870 m	MPC · JPL
527406	2007 UX_{53}	—	October 14, 2007	Kitt Peak	Spacewatch	·	810 m	MPC · JPL
527407	2007 UC_{54}	—	September 13, 2007	Mount Lemmon	Mount Lemmon Survey	·	3.1 km	MPC · JPL
527408	2007 UF_{56}	—	October 12, 2007	Catalina	CSS	H	550 m	MPC · JPL
527409	2007 UJ_{58}	—	October 30, 2007	Mount Lemmon	Mount Lemmon Survey	NYS	960 m	MPC · JPL
527410	2007 UT_{61}	—	October 5, 2007	Kitt Peak	Spacewatch	·	950 m	MPC · JPL
527411	2007 UZ_{61}	—	October 6, 2007	Kitt Peak	Spacewatch	THM	2.1 km	MPC · JPL
527412	2007 UJ_{62}	—	October 8, 2007	Mount Lemmon	Mount Lemmon Survey	·	830 m	MPC · JPL
527413	2007 UU_{63}	—	October 12, 2007	Kitt Peak	Spacewatch	EOS	1.4 km	MPC · JPL
527414	2007 UF_{65}	—	October 31, 2007	Kitt Peak	Spacewatch	·	1.9 km	MPC · JPL
527415	2007 UD_{69}	—	October 4, 2007	Kitt Peak	Spacewatch	·	2.4 km	MPC · JPL
527416	2007 UC_{73}	—	October 31, 2007	Mount Lemmon	Mount Lemmon Survey	·	2.2 km	MPC · JPL
527417	2007 UQ_{75}	—	October 31, 2007	Mount Lemmon	Mount Lemmon Survey	·	1.7 km	MPC · JPL
527418	2007 UL_{77}	—	October 31, 2007	Catalina	CSS	·	1.3 km	MPC · JPL
527419	2007 UP_{83}	—	October 16, 2007	Kitt Peak	Spacewatch	·	860 m	MPC · JPL
527420	2007 UK_{84}	—	September 18, 2007	Mount Lemmon	Mount Lemmon Survey	NYS	770 m	MPC · JPL
527421	2007 UJ_{86}	—	October 8, 2007	Kitt Peak	Spacewatch	THM	2.2 km	MPC · JPL
527422	2007 US_{86}	—	October 12, 2007	Kitt Peak	Spacewatch	THM	1.8 km	MPC · JPL
527423	2007 UV_{86}	—	October 30, 2007	Kitt Peak	Spacewatch	·	800 m	MPC · JPL
527424	2007 UT_{87}	—	October 30, 2007	Kitt Peak	Spacewatch	·	870 m	MPC · JPL
527425	2007 UN_{88}	—	October 9, 2007	Mount Lemmon	Mount Lemmon Survey	·	3.1 km	MPC · JPL
527426	2007 UY_{90}	—	October 10, 2007	Kitt Peak	Spacewatch	·	800 m	MPC · JPL
527427	2007 UZ_{93}	—	October 7, 2007	Mount Lemmon	Mount Lemmon Survey	·	2.9 km	MPC · JPL
527428	2007 UJ_{94}	—	October 31, 2007	Mount Lemmon	Mount Lemmon Survey	·	1.9 km	MPC · JPL
527429	2007 UB_{95}	—	October 15, 2007	Kitt Peak	Spacewatch	·	680 m	MPC · JPL
527430	2007 UK_{98}	—	October 10, 2007	Mount Lemmon	Mount Lemmon Survey	VER	2.6 km	MPC · JPL
527431	2007 UF_{102}	—	October 30, 2007	Kitt Peak	Spacewatch	·	2.3 km	MPC · JPL
527432	2007 UA_{104}	—	October 30, 2007	Kitt Peak	Spacewatch	THM	1.8 km	MPC · JPL
527433	2007 UZ_{105}	—	October 31, 2007	Kitt Peak	Spacewatch	·	2.0 km	MPC · JPL
527434	2007 UL_{106}	—	September 10, 2007	Mount Lemmon	Mount Lemmon Survey	·	740 m	MPC · JPL
527435	2007 UB_{108}	—	September 11, 2007	Mount Lemmon	Mount Lemmon Survey	·	710 m	MPC · JPL
527436	2007 UD_{114}	—	September 10, 2007	Mount Lemmon	Mount Lemmon Survey	·	1.0 km	MPC · JPL
527437	2007 UO_{114}	—	October 31, 2007	Kitt Peak	Spacewatch	·	2.8 km	MPC · JPL
527438	2007 UR_{114}	—	October 31, 2007	Kitt Peak	Spacewatch	·	760 m	MPC · JPL
527439	2007 UW_{117}	—	September 8, 2007	Mount Lemmon	Mount Lemmon Survey	·	800 m	MPC · JPL
527440	2007 UL_{119}	—	September 12, 2007	Mount Lemmon	Mount Lemmon Survey	·	1.2 km	MPC · JPL
527441	2007 UY_{119}	—	October 18, 2007	Mount Lemmon	Mount Lemmon Survey	·	1.8 km	MPC · JPL
527442	2007 UR_{120}	—	September 25, 2007	Mount Lemmon	Mount Lemmon Survey	·	750 m	MPC · JPL
527443	2007 UM_{126}	—	October 30, 2007	Apache Point	SDSS	T_{j} (2.62) · centaur	50 km	MPC · JPL
527444	2007 UA_{127}	—	October 20, 2007	Mount Lemmon	Mount Lemmon Survey	·	970 m	MPC · JPL
527445	2007 UE_{127}	—	October 24, 2007	Mount Lemmon	Mount Lemmon Survey	LIX	2.5 km	MPC · JPL
527446	2007 UU_{127}	—	October 20, 2007	Mount Lemmon	Mount Lemmon Survey	·	820 m	MPC · JPL
527447	2007 UG_{128}	—	October 20, 2007	Mount Lemmon	Mount Lemmon Survey	·	960 m	MPC · JPL
527448	2007 UJ_{128}	—	October 20, 2007	Mount Lemmon	Mount Lemmon Survey	THM	1.8 km	MPC · JPL
527449	2007 UO_{128}	—	October 20, 2007	Mount Lemmon	Mount Lemmon Survey	·	650 m	MPC · JPL
527450	2007 UA_{134}	—	October 16, 2007	Catalina	CSS	·	1.5 km	MPC · JPL
527451	2007 US_{134}	—	September 11, 2007	Mount Lemmon	Mount Lemmon Survey	(1298)	2.0 km	MPC · JPL
527452	2007 UF_{135}	—	October 18, 2007	Kitt Peak	Spacewatch	·	1.1 km	MPC · JPL
527453	2007 UN_{135}	—	October 12, 2007	Kitt Peak	Spacewatch	·	660 m	MPC · JPL
527454	2007 UZ_{137}	—	October 18, 2007	Kitt Peak	Spacewatch	·	660 m	MPC · JPL
527455	2007 UK_{143}	—	September 8, 2007	Mount Lemmon	Mount Lemmon Survey	·	3.2 km	MPC · JPL
527456	2007 UO_{143}	—	October 18, 2007	Kitt Peak	Spacewatch	EOS	1.8 km	MPC · JPL
527457	2007 UQ_{143}	—	October 20, 2007	Mount Lemmon	Mount Lemmon Survey	·	580 m	MPC · JPL
527458	2007 UR_{143}	—	October 21, 2007	Mount Lemmon	Mount Lemmon Survey	EOS	1.7 km	MPC · JPL
527459	2007 UV_{143}	—	October 16, 2007	Mount Lemmon	Mount Lemmon Survey	·	2.0 km	MPC · JPL
527460	2007 UY_{143}	—	October 17, 2007	Catalina	CSS	T_{j} (2.96)	4.7 km	MPC · JPL
527461	2007 UG_{144}	—	October 18, 2007	Mount Lemmon	Mount Lemmon Survey	·	870 m	MPC · JPL
527462	2007 UH_{144}	—	September 11, 2007	Mount Lemmon	Mount Lemmon Survey	·	1.2 km	MPC · JPL
527463	2007 UK_{144}	—	October 18, 2007	Mount Lemmon	Mount Lemmon Survey	·	960 m	MPC · JPL
527464	2007 UN_{144}	—	May 20, 2006	Kitt Peak	Spacewatch	·	2.3 km	MPC · JPL
527465	2007 UO_{144}	—	October 19, 2007	Mount Lemmon	Mount Lemmon Survey	EOS	1.8 km	MPC · JPL
527466	2007 UR_{144}	—	October 20, 2007	Mount Lemmon	Mount Lemmon Survey	·	1.3 km	MPC · JPL
527467	2007 UA_{145}	—	October 21, 2007	Mount Lemmon	Mount Lemmon Survey	·	930 m	MPC · JPL
527468	2007 UD_{145}	—	October 21, 2007	Mount Lemmon	Mount Lemmon Survey	HOF	2.4 km	MPC · JPL
527469	2007 UF_{145}	—	October 21, 2007	Mount Lemmon	Mount Lemmon Survey	·	4.4 km	MPC · JPL
527470	2007 UH_{145}	—	October 21, 2007	Mount Lemmon	Mount Lemmon Survey	·	2.7 km	MPC · JPL
527471	2007 UK_{145}	—	May 6, 2006	Mount Lemmon	Mount Lemmon Survey	·	2.0 km	MPC · JPL
527472	2007 UL_{145}	—	October 24, 2007	Mount Lemmon	Mount Lemmon Survey	EOS	2.0 km	MPC · JPL
527473	2007 UM_{145}	—	October 30, 2007	Catalina	CSS	·	710 m	MPC · JPL
527474	2007 UR_{145}	—	October 30, 2007	Mount Lemmon	Mount Lemmon Survey	KOR	1.1 km	MPC · JPL
527475	2007 UT_{145}	—	October 30, 2007	Mount Lemmon	Mount Lemmon Survey	HOF	2.2 km	MPC · JPL
527476	2007 UW_{145}	—	October 31, 2007	Mount Lemmon	Mount Lemmon Survey	·	2.2 km	MPC · JPL
527477	2007 VA	—	November 1, 2007	Charleston	Astronomical Research Observatory	·	2.0 km	MPC · JPL
527478	2007 VN_{1}	—	October 8, 2007	Catalina	CSS	·	2.9 km	MPC · JPL
527479	2007 VH_{6}	—	November 3, 2007	Mount Lemmon	Mount Lemmon Survey	T_{j} (2.97) · EUP	4.4 km	MPC · JPL
527480	2007 VU_{13}	—	October 10, 2007	Kitt Peak	Spacewatch	EOS	1.5 km	MPC · JPL
527481	2007 VA_{15}	—	October 12, 2007	Mount Lemmon	Mount Lemmon Survey	EUN	1.3 km	MPC · JPL
527482	2007 VN_{15}	—	November 1, 2007	Kitt Peak	Spacewatch	·	2.3 km	MPC · JPL
527483	2007 VO_{18}	—	November 1, 2007	Mount Lemmon	Mount Lemmon Survey	·	2.3 km	MPC · JPL
527484	2007 VB_{19}	—	October 10, 2007	Kitt Peak	Spacewatch	·	860 m	MPC · JPL
527485	2007 VL_{19}	—	November 1, 2007	Mount Lemmon	Mount Lemmon Survey	AST	1.4 km	MPC · JPL
527486	2007 VC_{25}	—	November 2, 2007	Mount Lemmon	Mount Lemmon Survey	·	930 m	MPC · JPL
527487	2007 VT_{30}	—	November 2, 2007	Kitt Peak	Spacewatch	·	2.0 km	MPC · JPL
527488	2007 VF_{32}	—	November 2, 2007	Kitt Peak	Spacewatch	PHO	780 m	MPC · JPL
527489	2007 VK_{32}	—	October 11, 2007	Kitt Peak	Spacewatch	·	1.7 km	MPC · JPL
527490	2007 VO_{32}	—	October 15, 2007	Kitt Peak	Spacewatch	·	3.1 km	MPC · JPL
527491	2007 VU_{32}	—	October 11, 2007	Kitt Peak	Spacewatch	·	470 m	MPC · JPL
527492	2007 VK_{41}	—	November 3, 2007	Mount Lemmon	Mount Lemmon Survey	·	1.7 km	MPC · JPL
527493	2007 VF_{44}	—	October 18, 2007	Kitt Peak	Spacewatch	EOS	1.8 km	MPC · JPL
527494	2007 VL_{44}	—	November 1, 2007	Kitt Peak	Spacewatch	·	2.6 km	MPC · JPL
527495	2007 VB_{45}	—	October 21, 2007	Kitt Peak	Spacewatch	VER	2.0 km	MPC · JPL
527496	2007 VG_{45}	—	November 1, 2007	Kitt Peak	Spacewatch	·	2.5 km	MPC · JPL
527497	2007 VO_{45}	—	November 1, 2007	Kitt Peak	Spacewatch	·	930 m	MPC · JPL
527498	2007 VR_{45}	—	November 1, 2007	Kitt Peak	Spacewatch	·	890 m	MPC · JPL
527499	2007 VG_{48}	—	October 9, 2007	Kitt Peak	Spacewatch	·	2.1 km	MPC · JPL
527500	2007 VX_{48}	—	November 1, 2007	Kitt Peak	Spacewatch	·	2.9 km	MPC · JPL

== 527501–527600 ==
back to top

Designation			Discovery			Properties		Ref
Permanent	Provisional	Named after	Date	Site	Discoverer(s)	Category	Diam.	Ref
527501	2007 VM_{51}	—	November 1, 2007	Kitt Peak	Spacewatch	·	2.5 km	MPC · JPL
527502	2007 VS_{52}	—	November 1, 2007	Kitt Peak	Spacewatch	·	690 m	MPC · JPL
527503	2007 VN_{53}	—	October 20, 2007	Mount Lemmon	Mount Lemmon Survey	·	1.3 km	MPC · JPL
527504	2007 VB_{57}	—	November 1, 2007	Kitt Peak	Spacewatch	H	480 m	MPC · JPL
527505	2007 VC_{60}	—	October 21, 2007	Catalina	CSS	·	2.3 km	MPC · JPL
527506	2007 VW_{64}	—	November 1, 2007	Kitt Peak	Spacewatch	TIR	2.8 km	MPC · JPL
527507	2007 VQ_{66}	—	November 2, 2007	Kitt Peak	Spacewatch	·	640 m	MPC · JPL
527508	2007 VJ_{67}	—	November 3, 2007	Kitt Peak	Spacewatch	THM	1.9 km	MPC · JPL
527509	2007 VO_{71}	—	October 15, 2007	Mount Lemmon	Mount Lemmon Survey	H	420 m	MPC · JPL
527510	2007 VS_{71}	—	October 30, 2007	Catalina	CSS	H	460 m	MPC · JPL
527511	2007 VV_{74}	—	September 10, 2007	Mount Lemmon	Mount Lemmon Survey	·	2.3 km	MPC · JPL
527512	2007 VC_{75}	—	October 18, 2007	Kitt Peak	Spacewatch	·	1.8 km	MPC · JPL
527513	2007 VB_{78}	—	November 3, 2007	Kitt Peak	Spacewatch	MAS	450 m	MPC · JPL
527514	2007 VD_{78}	—	November 3, 2007	Kitt Peak	Spacewatch	NYS	680 m	MPC · JPL
527515	2007 VO_{82}	—	October 8, 2007	Kitt Peak	Spacewatch	AST	1.6 km	MPC · JPL
527516	2007 VU_{82}	—	October 10, 2007	Mount Lemmon	Mount Lemmon Survey	·	1.0 km	MPC · JPL
527517	2007 VV_{86}	—	October 21, 2007	Kitt Peak	Spacewatch	·	870 m	MPC · JPL
527518	2007 VW_{87}	—	November 8, 2007	Catalina	CSS	·	2.7 km	MPC · JPL
527519	2007 VZ_{88}	—	October 9, 2007	Catalina	CSS	·	2.3 km	MPC · JPL
527520	2007 VK_{90}	—	October 24, 2007	Mount Lemmon	Mount Lemmon Survey	·	790 m	MPC · JPL
527521	2007 VU_{90}	—	September 14, 2007	Mount Lemmon	Mount Lemmon Survey	·	2.9 km	MPC · JPL
527522	2007 VO_{96}	—	November 1, 2007	Kitt Peak	Spacewatch	·	2.7 km	MPC · JPL
527523	2007 VY_{96}	—	November 1, 2007	Kitt Peak	Spacewatch	·	1.4 km	MPC · JPL
527524	2007 VB_{109}	—	November 3, 2007	Kitt Peak	Spacewatch	THM	1.6 km	MPC · JPL
527525	2007 VV_{111}	—	October 30, 2007	Kitt Peak	Spacewatch	·	1.5 km	MPC · JPL
527526	2007 VP_{114}	—	November 3, 2007	Kitt Peak	Spacewatch	·	2.4 km	MPC · JPL
527527	2007 VJ_{118}	—	October 10, 2007	Mount Lemmon	Mount Lemmon Survey	TIR	2.9 km	MPC · JPL
527528	2007 VR_{118}	—	October 14, 2007	Mount Lemmon	Mount Lemmon Survey	·	2.5 km	MPC · JPL
527529	2007 VD_{120}	—	November 5, 2007	Kitt Peak	Spacewatch	·	2.0 km	MPC · JPL
527530	2007 VV_{126}	—	September 9, 2007	Mount Lemmon	Mount Lemmon Survey	·	1.1 km	MPC · JPL
527531	2007 VP_{127}	—	September 14, 1996	Kitt Peak	Spacewatch	·	2.0 km	MPC · JPL
527532	2007 VK_{132}	—	October 12, 2007	Kitt Peak	Spacewatch	KOR	1.2 km	MPC · JPL
527533	2007 VC_{134}	—	November 3, 2007	Kitt Peak	Spacewatch	·	2.8 km	MPC · JPL
527534	2007 VP_{134}	—	October 8, 2007	Catalina	CSS	H	430 m	MPC · JPL
527535	2007 VO_{138}	—	October 10, 2007	Kitt Peak	Spacewatch	NYS	950 m	MPC · JPL
527536	2007 VB_{140}	—	November 3, 2007	Kitt Peak	Spacewatch	·	840 m	MPC · JPL
527537	2007 VN_{142}	—	November 4, 2007	Kitt Peak	Spacewatch	·	720 m	MPC · JPL
527538	2007 VX_{143}	—	September 10, 2007	Mount Lemmon	Mount Lemmon Survey	·	1.5 km	MPC · JPL
527539	2007 VX_{144}	—	October 20, 2007	Mount Lemmon	Mount Lemmon Survey	·	2.8 km	MPC · JPL
527540	2007 VN_{146}	—	November 4, 2007	Kitt Peak	Spacewatch	VER	2.1 km	MPC · JPL
527541	2007 VW_{146}	—	November 4, 2007	Kitt Peak	Spacewatch	MAS	530 m	MPC · JPL
527542	2007 VH_{149}	—	November 7, 2007	Catalina	CSS	·	790 m	MPC · JPL
527543	2007 VU_{149}	—	October 19, 2007	Kitt Peak	Spacewatch	·	2.8 km	MPC · JPL
527544	2007 VS_{152}	—	November 2, 2007	Mount Lemmon	Mount Lemmon Survey	·	670 m	MPC · JPL
527545	2007 VV_{154}	—	October 9, 2007	Kitt Peak	Spacewatch	·	2.7 km	MPC · JPL
527546	2007 VF_{156}	—	November 5, 2007	Kitt Peak	Spacewatch	·	640 m	MPC · JPL
527547	2007 VJ_{156}	—	November 5, 2007	Kitt Peak	Spacewatch	·	2.1 km	MPC · JPL
527548	2007 VO_{156}	—	November 5, 2007	Mount Lemmon	Mount Lemmon Survey	·	2.5 km	MPC · JPL
527549	2007 VA_{158}	—	October 20, 2007	Mount Lemmon	Mount Lemmon Survey	·	630 m	MPC · JPL
527550	2007 VL_{158}	—	October 20, 2007	Mount Lemmon	Mount Lemmon Survey	·	2.7 km	MPC · JPL
527551	2007 VW_{159}	—	November 5, 2007	Kitt Peak	Spacewatch	·	1.9 km	MPC · JPL
527552	2007 VE_{163}	—	October 24, 2007	Mount Lemmon	Mount Lemmon Survey	·	2.5 km	MPC · JPL
527553	2007 VO_{164}	—	November 5, 2007	Kitt Peak	Spacewatch	EUP	3.0 km	MPC · JPL
527554	2007 VU_{165}	—	October 16, 2007	Mount Lemmon	Mount Lemmon Survey	·	3.5 km	MPC · JPL
527555	2007 VA_{173}	—	October 7, 2007	Mount Lemmon	Mount Lemmon Survey	VER	2.2 km	MPC · JPL
527556	2007 VB_{180}	—	October 10, 2007	Mount Lemmon	Mount Lemmon Survey	·	2.7 km	MPC · JPL
527557	2007 VP_{183}	—	November 8, 2007	Mount Lemmon	Mount Lemmon Survey	·	670 m	MPC · JPL
527558	2007 VJ_{186}	—	November 2, 2007	Catalina	CSS	H	390 m	MPC · JPL
527559	2007 VZ_{186}	—	October 12, 2007	Kitt Peak	Spacewatch	·	1.9 km	MPC · JPL
527560	2007 VY_{190}	—	November 15, 2007	Catalina	CSS	H	570 m	MPC · JPL
527561	2007 VY_{192}	—	November 4, 2007	Mount Lemmon	Mount Lemmon Survey	·	2.0 km	MPC · JPL
527562	2007 VZ_{194}	—	November 5, 2007	Mount Lemmon	Mount Lemmon Survey	·	1.8 km	MPC · JPL
527563	2007 VA_{196}	—	October 5, 2007	Kitt Peak	Spacewatch	KOR	1.2 km	MPC · JPL
527564	2007 VC_{204}	—	November 9, 2007	Kitt Peak	Spacewatch	·	2.7 km	MPC · JPL
527565	2007 VO_{210}	—	October 18, 2007	Mount Lemmon	Mount Lemmon Survey	MAS	590 m	MPC · JPL
527566	2007 VX_{210}	—	November 1, 2007	Kitt Peak	Spacewatch	·	2.9 km	MPC · JPL
527567	2007 VC_{214}	—	November 9, 2007	Kitt Peak	Spacewatch	·	2.7 km	MPC · JPL
527568	2007 VT_{214}	—	October 20, 2007	Mount Lemmon	Mount Lemmon Survey	·	1.5 km	MPC · JPL
527569	2007 VX_{217}	—	November 9, 2007	Kitt Peak	Spacewatch	EOS	1.8 km	MPC · JPL
527570	2007 VZ_{217}	—	November 9, 2007	Kitt Peak	Spacewatch	LIX	2.9 km	MPC · JPL
527571	2007 VS_{220}	—	November 9, 2007	Kitt Peak	Spacewatch	NYS	730 m	MPC · JPL
527572	2007 VS_{225}	—	October 16, 2007	Kitt Peak	Spacewatch	·	2.2 km	MPC · JPL
527573	2007 VV_{226}	—	November 4, 2007	Kitt Peak	Spacewatch	H	400 m	MPC · JPL
527574	2007 VV_{229}	—	October 30, 2007	Mount Lemmon	Mount Lemmon Survey	·	2.7 km	MPC · JPL
527575	2007 VB_{230}	—	November 7, 2007	Kitt Peak	Spacewatch	·	630 m	MPC · JPL
527576	2007 VS_{230}	—	October 17, 2007	Mount Lemmon	Mount Lemmon Survey	·	700 m	MPC · JPL
527577	2007 VZ_{231}	—	November 7, 2007	Kitt Peak	Spacewatch	·	860 m	MPC · JPL
527578	2007 VB_{233}	—	November 7, 2007	Kitt Peak	Spacewatch	·	820 m	MPC · JPL
527579	2007 VZ_{234}	—	November 9, 2007	Kitt Peak	Spacewatch	·	1.7 km	MPC · JPL
527580	2007 VW_{236}	—	October 15, 2007	Kitt Peak	Spacewatch	·	610 m	MPC · JPL
527581	2007 VC_{237}	—	October 30, 2007	Kitt Peak	Spacewatch	MAS	440 m	MPC · JPL
527582	2007 VB_{238}	—	October 9, 2007	Kitt Peak	Spacewatch	NYS	830 m	MPC · JPL
527583	2007 VS_{239}	—	November 5, 2007	Kitt Peak	Spacewatch	V	490 m	MPC · JPL
527584	2007 VW_{242}	—	October 8, 2007	Mount Lemmon	Mount Lemmon Survey	·	1.4 km	MPC · JPL
527585	2007 VZ_{245}	—	October 9, 2007	Mount Lemmon	Mount Lemmon Survey	·	1.5 km	MPC · JPL
527586	2007 VE_{260}	—	October 7, 2007	Catalina	CSS	TIR	3.0 km	MPC · JPL
527587	2007 VR_{260}	—	October 21, 2007	Catalina	CSS	·	730 m	MPC · JPL
527588	2007 VY_{260}	—	September 19, 2006	Kitt Peak	Spacewatch	·	2.3 km	MPC · JPL
527589	2007 VD_{261}	—	November 9, 2007	Kitt Peak	Spacewatch	·	3.1 km	MPC · JPL
527590	2007 VD_{269}	—	November 8, 2007	Kitt Peak	Spacewatch	·	2.2 km	MPC · JPL
527591	2007 VH_{269}	—	October 20, 2007	Catalina	CSS	THB · slow	2.8 km	MPC · JPL
527592	2007 VK_{277}	—	September 9, 2007	Mount Lemmon	Mount Lemmon Survey	·	500 m	MPC · JPL
527593	2007 VJ_{278}	—	October 10, 2007	Mount Lemmon	Mount Lemmon Survey	·	2.7 km	MPC · JPL
527594	2007 VX_{280}	—	November 3, 2007	Kitt Peak	Spacewatch	KOR	1.2 km	MPC · JPL
527595	2007 VR_{284}	—	November 5, 2007	Kitt Peak	Spacewatch	NYS	850 m	MPC · JPL
527596	2007 VW_{284}	—	November 5, 2007	Kitt Peak	Spacewatch	·	1.7 km	MPC · JPL
527597	2007 VR_{286}	—	November 14, 2007	Kitt Peak	Spacewatch	·	2.6 km	MPC · JPL
527598	2007 VT_{287}	—	November 2, 2007	Kitt Peak	Spacewatch	VER	2.4 km	MPC · JPL
527599	2007 VK_{290}	—	November 14, 2007	Kitt Peak	Spacewatch	·	1.7 km	MPC · JPL
527600	2007 VD_{297}	—	November 11, 2007	Catalina	CSS	·	2.6 km	MPC · JPL

== 527601–527700 ==
back to top

Designation			Discovery			Properties		Ref
Permanent	Provisional	Named after	Date	Site	Discoverer(s)	Category	Diam.	Ref
527601	2007 VY_{297}	—	October 8, 2007	Anderson Mesa	LONEOS	·	790 m	MPC · JPL
527602	2007 VF_{298}	—	October 10, 2007	Catalina	CSS	·	2.7 km	MPC · JPL
527603	2007 VJ_{305}	—	November 4, 2007	Apache Point	A. C. Becker, Puckett, A. W., Kubica, J.	SDO	160 km	MPC · JPL
527604	2007 VL_{305}	—	November 4, 2007	Apache Point	A. C. Becker, Puckett, A. W., Kubica, J.	NT	112 km	MPC · JPL
527605	2007 VY_{305}	—	November 6, 2007	Kitt Peak	Spacewatch	·	3.0 km	MPC · JPL
527606	2007 VU_{306}	—	November 1, 2007	Kitt Peak	Spacewatch	·	710 m	MPC · JPL
527607	2007 VL_{309}	—	November 12, 2007	Mount Lemmon	Mount Lemmon Survey	H	750 m	MPC · JPL
527608	2007 VT_{311}	—	November 1, 2007	Kitt Peak	Spacewatch	·	3.3 km	MPC · JPL
527609	2007 VB_{312}	—	November 9, 2007	Kitt Peak	Spacewatch	·	2.5 km	MPC · JPL
527610	2007 VK_{312}	—	November 2, 2007	Kitt Peak	Spacewatch	·	1.6 km	MPC · JPL
527611	2007 VU_{313}	—	November 11, 2007	Mount Lemmon	Mount Lemmon Survey	·	1.0 km	MPC · JPL
527612	2007 VP_{315}	—	November 7, 2007	Kitt Peak	Spacewatch	·	650 m	MPC · JPL
527613	2007 VG_{318}	—	November 1, 2007	Kitt Peak	Spacewatch	·	2.0 km	MPC · JPL
527614	2007 VT_{319}	—	November 3, 2007	Kitt Peak	Spacewatch	·	630 m	MPC · JPL
527615	2007 VU_{319}	—	November 9, 2007	Kitt Peak	Spacewatch	·	1.7 km	MPC · JPL
527616	2007 VP_{320}	—	November 11, 2007	Mount Lemmon	Mount Lemmon Survey	CYB	3.6 km	MPC · JPL
527617	2007 VX_{320}	—	November 2, 2007	Catalina	CSS	·	850 m	MPC · JPL
527618	2007 VJ_{321}	—	November 8, 2007	Catalina	CSS	·	3.5 km	MPC · JPL
527619	2007 VD_{322}	—	November 11, 2007	Catalina	CSS	THB	2.6 km	MPC · JPL
527620	2007 VX_{323}	—	November 4, 2007	Kitt Peak	Spacewatch	·	850 m	MPC · JPL
527621	2007 VA_{328}	—	November 8, 2007	Catalina	CSS	EUP	3.6 km	MPC · JPL
527622	2007 VD_{330}	—	October 10, 2007	Mount Lemmon	Mount Lemmon Survey	·	780 m	MPC · JPL
527623	2007 VK_{331}	—	November 6, 2007	Kitt Peak	Spacewatch	·	3.4 km	MPC · JPL
527624	2007 VN_{333}	—	November 11, 2007	Mount Lemmon	Mount Lemmon Survey	·	2.3 km	MPC · JPL
527625	2007 VC_{338}	—	November 4, 2007	Mount Lemmon	Mount Lemmon Survey	·	2.8 km	MPC · JPL
527626	2007 VE_{338}	—	November 8, 2007	Catalina	CSS	EOS	2.4 km	MPC · JPL
527627	2007 VO_{338}	—	September 21, 2003	Kitt Peak	Spacewatch	·	1.3 km	MPC · JPL
527628	2007 VX_{338}	—	November 4, 2007	Kitt Peak	Spacewatch	·	2.2 km	MPC · JPL
527629	2007 VY_{338}	—	November 4, 2007	Kitt Peak	Spacewatch	·	1.7 km	MPC · JPL
527630	2007 VD_{339}	—	November 7, 2007	Kitt Peak	Spacewatch	·	2.2 km	MPC · JPL
527631	2007 VG_{339}	—	November 9, 2007	Kitt Peak	Spacewatch	·	640 m	MPC · JPL
527632	2007 VL_{339}	—	November 9, 2007	Kitt Peak	Spacewatch	LUT	2.9 km	MPC · JPL
527633	2007 VT_{339}	—	March 16, 2005	Catalina	CSS	·	1.0 km	MPC · JPL
527634	2007 VV_{339}	—	November 9, 2007	Mount Lemmon	Mount Lemmon Survey	·	790 m	MPC · JPL
527635	2007 VY_{339}	—	November 14, 2007	Mount Lemmon	Mount Lemmon Survey	KOR	1.3 km	MPC · JPL
527636	2007 VA_{340}	—	October 4, 2007	Kitt Peak	Spacewatch	NYS	590 m	MPC · JPL
527637	2007 VC_{340}	—	November 2, 2007	Catalina	CSS	H	490 m	MPC · JPL
527638	2007 VF_{340}	—	November 2, 2007	Mount Lemmon	Mount Lemmon Survey	·	850 m	MPC · JPL
527639	2007 VK_{340}	—	November 2, 2007	Catalina	CSS	·	650 m	MPC · JPL
527640	2007 VS_{340}	—	November 4, 2007	Mount Lemmon	Mount Lemmon Survey	·	2.3 km	MPC · JPL
527641	2007 VU_{340}	—	November 5, 2007	Mount Lemmon	Mount Lemmon Survey	T_{j} (2.99)	3.7 km	MPC · JPL
527642	2007 VZ_{340}	—	November 7, 2007	Mount Lemmon	Mount Lemmon Survey	·	3.1 km	MPC · JPL
527643	2007 VH_{341}	—	November 8, 2007	Mount Lemmon	Mount Lemmon Survey	·	3.2 km	MPC · JPL
527644	2007 VN_{341}	—	November 9, 2007	Mount Lemmon	Mount Lemmon Survey	·	930 m	MPC · JPL
527645	2007 VQ_{341}	—	November 9, 2007	Mount Lemmon	Mount Lemmon Survey	·	1.8 km	MPC · JPL
527646	2007 VT_{341}	—	November 11, 2007	Mount Lemmon	Mount Lemmon Survey	·	2.3 km	MPC · JPL
527647	2007 VX_{341}	—	November 11, 2007	Mount Lemmon	Mount Lemmon Survey	·	3.2 km	MPC · JPL
527648	2007 VY_{341}	—	November 11, 2007	Mount Lemmon	Mount Lemmon Survey	·	2.5 km	MPC · JPL
527649	2007 VA_{342}	—	November 13, 2007	Mount Lemmon	Mount Lemmon Survey	·	1.8 km	MPC · JPL
527650	2007 VC_{342}	—	November 14, 2007	Mount Lemmon	Mount Lemmon Survey	·	1.7 km	MPC · JPL
527651	2007 VD_{342}	—	November 14, 2007	Mount Lemmon	Mount Lemmon Survey	H	580 m	MPC · JPL
527652	2007 VF_{342}	—	November 15, 2007	Mount Lemmon	Mount Lemmon Survey	EOS	1.8 km	MPC · JPL
527653	2007 WG	—	November 16, 2007	Charleston	Astronomical Research Observatory	·	2.3 km	MPC · JPL
527654	2007 WA_{1}	—	October 9, 2007	Catalina	CSS	·	3.3 km	MPC · JPL
527655	2007 WE_{2}	—	November 18, 2007	Bisei SG Center	BATTeRS	·	3.4 km	MPC · JPL
527656	2007 WZ_{5}	—	November 20, 2007	Mount Lemmon	Mount Lemmon Survey	H	460 m	MPC · JPL
527657	2007 WC_{12}	—	October 10, 2007	Catalina	CSS	·	2.9 km	MPC · JPL
527658	2007 WF_{18}	—	September 15, 2007	Mount Lemmon	Mount Lemmon Survey	·	2.3 km	MPC · JPL
527659	2007 WQ_{22}	—	November 17, 2007	Kitt Peak	Spacewatch	HYG	2.1 km	MPC · JPL
527660	2007 WB_{24}	—	October 10, 2007	Mount Lemmon	Mount Lemmon Survey	MAS	580 m	MPC · JPL
527661	2007 WC_{27}	—	November 18, 2007	Mount Lemmon	Mount Lemmon Survey	·	930 m	MPC · JPL
527662	2007 WJ_{27}	—	November 18, 2007	Mount Lemmon	Mount Lemmon Survey	EOS	2.0 km	MPC · JPL
527663	2007 WS_{27}	—	November 7, 2007	Kitt Peak	Spacewatch	V	600 m	MPC · JPL
527664	2007 WK_{30}	—	October 16, 2007	Mount Lemmon	Mount Lemmon Survey	·	880 m	MPC · JPL
527665	2007 WJ_{37}	—	November 19, 2007	Mount Lemmon	Mount Lemmon Survey	EUP	3.0 km	MPC · JPL
527666	2007 WZ_{37}	—	November 4, 2007	Kitt Peak	Spacewatch	V	570 m	MPC · JPL
527667	2007 WN_{45}	—	November 20, 2007	Mount Lemmon	Mount Lemmon Survey	·	3.0 km	MPC · JPL
527668	2007 WW_{52}	—	November 8, 2007	Catalina	CSS	·	2.9 km	MPC · JPL
527669	2007 WD_{53}	—	October 14, 2007	Mount Lemmon	Mount Lemmon Survey	·	670 m	MPC · JPL
527670	2007 WT_{53}	—	November 18, 2007	Mount Lemmon	Mount Lemmon Survey	·	890 m	MPC · JPL
527671	2007 WF_{55}	—	November 29, 2007	Socorro	LINEAR	AMO	520 m	MPC · JPL
527672	2007 WQ_{59}	—	November 17, 2007	Mount Lemmon	Mount Lemmon Survey	H	560 m	MPC · JPL
527673	2007 WK_{62}	—	December 4, 2007	Anderson Mesa	LONEOS	H	700 m	MPC · JPL
527674	2007 WU_{64}	—	November 17, 2007	Kitt Peak	Spacewatch	·	1.2 km	MPC · JPL
527675	2007 WY_{64}	—	November 16, 2007	Mount Lemmon	Mount Lemmon Survey	·	3.2 km	MPC · JPL
527676	2007 WH_{65}	—	November 19, 2007	Mount Lemmon	Mount Lemmon Survey	·	3.1 km	MPC · JPL
527677	2007 WJ_{65}	—	November 19, 2007	Mount Lemmon	Mount Lemmon Survey	EOS	1.7 km	MPC · JPL
527678	2007 WK_{65}	—	November 19, 2007	Mount Lemmon	Mount Lemmon Survey	EOS	2.1 km	MPC · JPL
527679	2007 XJ	—	November 8, 2007	Kitt Peak	Spacewatch	·	3.3 km	MPC · JPL
527680	2007 XS_{5}	—	December 4, 2007	Catalina	CSS	·	2.3 km	MPC · JPL
527681	2007 XF_{6}	—	November 3, 2007	Mount Lemmon	Mount Lemmon Survey	·	2.5 km	MPC · JPL
527682	2007 XR_{8}	—	December 4, 2007	Mount Lemmon	Mount Lemmon Survey	·	810 m	MPC · JPL
527683	2007 XR_{11}	—	October 21, 2007	Mount Lemmon	Mount Lemmon Survey	·	2.3 km	MPC · JPL
527684	2007 XC_{12}	—	November 4, 2007	Kitt Peak	Spacewatch	·	520 m	MPC · JPL
527685	2007 XH_{12}	—	September 14, 2007	Mount Lemmon	Mount Lemmon Survey	THM	2.3 km	MPC · JPL
527686	2007 XG_{13}	—	November 8, 2007	Mount Lemmon	Mount Lemmon Survey	·	2.4 km	MPC · JPL
527687	2007 XE_{16}	—	November 13, 2007	Kitt Peak	Spacewatch	·	2.2 km	MPC · JPL
527688	2007 XN_{30}	—	November 19, 2007	Kitt Peak	Spacewatch	·	750 m	MPC · JPL
527689	2007 XK_{34}	—	October 16, 2007	Catalina	CSS	·	2.8 km	MPC · JPL
527690	2007 XS_{42}	—	December 6, 2007	Kitt Peak	Spacewatch	·	670 m	MPC · JPL
527691	2007 XH_{46}	—	December 5, 2007	Catalina	CSS	T_{j} (2.97)	3.3 km	MPC · JPL
527692	2007 XB_{47}	—	November 7, 2007	Kitt Peak	Spacewatch	·	2.1 km	MPC · JPL
527693	2007 XP_{52}	—	December 15, 2007	Kitt Peak	Spacewatch	·	1.3 km	MPC · JPL
527694	2007 XF_{55}	—	December 15, 2007	Kitt Peak	Spacewatch	·	3.5 km	MPC · JPL
527695	2007 XL_{60}	—	December 14, 2007	Mount Lemmon	Mount Lemmon Survey	·	2.1 km	MPC · JPL
527696	2007 XR_{60}	—	December 4, 2007	Mount Lemmon	Mount Lemmon Survey	EOS	1.6 km	MPC · JPL
527697	2007 XS_{60}	—	December 5, 2007	Kitt Peak	Spacewatch	·	2.4 km	MPC · JPL
527698	2007 XT_{60}	—	September 11, 2001	Socorro	LINEAR	·	3.7 km	MPC · JPL
527699	2007 XY_{60}	—	December 4, 2007	Mount Lemmon	Mount Lemmon Survey	·	750 m	MPC · JPL
527700	2007 XB_{61}	—	September 16, 2006	Catalina	CSS	·	3.3 km	MPC · JPL

== 527701–527800 ==
back to top

Designation			Discovery			Properties		Ref
Permanent	Provisional	Named after	Date	Site	Discoverer(s)	Category	Diam.	Ref
527701	2007 XD_{61}	—	November 8, 2007	Kitt Peak	Spacewatch	·	1.9 km	MPC · JPL
527702	2007 XF_{61}	—	November 8, 2007	Kitt Peak	Spacewatch	·	2.2 km	MPC · JPL
527703	2007 YH_{4}	—	November 9, 2007	Mount Lemmon	Mount Lemmon Survey	·	2.1 km	MPC · JPL
527704	2007 YL_{5}	—	November 2, 2007	Kitt Peak	Spacewatch	·	2.5 km	MPC · JPL
527705	2007 YD_{16}	—	December 5, 2007	Kitt Peak	Spacewatch	·	880 m	MPC · JPL
527706	2007 YY_{27}	—	September 19, 2006	Kitt Peak	Spacewatch	·	1.8 km	MPC · JPL
527707	2007 YF_{28}	—	December 18, 2007	Mount Lemmon	Mount Lemmon Survey	·	840 m	MPC · JPL
527708	2007 YA_{33}	—	November 19, 2007	Kitt Peak	Spacewatch	·	2.1 km	MPC · JPL
527709	2007 YH_{41}	—	September 12, 2007	Mount Lemmon	Mount Lemmon Survey	T_{j} (2.97)	4.3 km	MPC · JPL
527710	2007 YL_{44}	—	December 30, 2007	Kitt Peak	Spacewatch	MAS	580 m	MPC · JPL
527711	2007 YX_{48}	—	December 20, 2007	Kitt Peak	Spacewatch	·	2.9 km	MPC · JPL
527712	2007 YR_{52}	—	November 20, 2007	Catalina	CSS	·	2.3 km	MPC · JPL
527713	2007 YR_{54}	—	December 31, 2007	Catalina	CSS	·	2.5 km	MPC · JPL
527714	2007 YG_{55}	—	December 31, 2007	Mount Lemmon	Mount Lemmon Survey	·	410 m	MPC · JPL
527715	2007 YQ_{56}	—	December 31, 2007	Anderson Mesa	LONEOS	APO · PHA	360 m	MPC · JPL
527716	2007 YG_{58}	—	December 31, 2007	Kitt Peak	Spacewatch	·	1.6 km	MPC · JPL
527717	2007 YV_{58}	—	December 5, 2007	Mount Lemmon	Mount Lemmon Survey	·	1.2 km	MPC · JPL
527718	2007 YZ_{61}	—	December 17, 2007	Mount Lemmon	Mount Lemmon Survey	·	2.7 km	MPC · JPL
527719	2007 YZ_{62}	—	December 30, 2007	Kitt Peak	Spacewatch	·	1.7 km	MPC · JPL
527720	2007 YM_{65}	—	December 18, 2007	Mount Lemmon	Mount Lemmon Survey	·	870 m	MPC · JPL
527721	2007 YV_{65}	—	December 30, 2007	Mount Lemmon	Mount Lemmon Survey	·	2.3 km	MPC · JPL
527722	2007 YX_{73}	—	December 31, 2007	Kitt Peak	Spacewatch	·	3.0 km	MPC · JPL
527723	2007 YG_{74}	—	December 31, 2007	Kitt Peak	Spacewatch	·	2.2 km	MPC · JPL
527724	2007 YS_{75}	—	December 31, 2007	Kitt Peak	Spacewatch	EOS	1.8 km	MPC · JPL
527725	2007 YV_{75}	—	December 18, 2007	Mount Lemmon	Mount Lemmon Survey	·	3.3 km	MPC · JPL
527726	2007 YW_{75}	—	December 19, 2007	Mount Lemmon	Mount Lemmon Survey	ARM	3.4 km	MPC · JPL
527727	2007 YX_{75}	—	December 30, 2007	Mount Lemmon	Mount Lemmon Survey	·	3.2 km	MPC · JPL
527728	2007 YB_{76}	—	December 16, 2007	Mount Lemmon	Mount Lemmon Survey	·	1.8 km	MPC · JPL
527729	2007 YE_{76}	—	December 16, 2007	Mount Lemmon	Mount Lemmon Survey	·	1.8 km	MPC · JPL
527730	2007 YK_{76}	—	December 17, 2007	Kitt Peak	Spacewatch	·	1.0 km	MPC · JPL
527731	2007 YM_{76}	—	December 17, 2007	Mount Lemmon	Mount Lemmon Survey	·	1.6 km	MPC · JPL
527732	2007 YR_{76}	—	December 18, 2007	Mount Lemmon	Mount Lemmon Survey	EOS	1.7 km	MPC · JPL
527733	2007 YS_{76}	—	December 18, 2007	Mount Lemmon	Mount Lemmon Survey	·	1.8 km	MPC · JPL
527734	2007 YT_{76}	—	December 18, 2007	Mount Lemmon	Mount Lemmon Survey	NYS	880 m	MPC · JPL
527735	2007 YW_{76}	—	December 19, 2007	Mount Lemmon	Mount Lemmon Survey	H	460 m	MPC · JPL
527736	2007 YY_{76}	—	December 19, 2007	Mount Lemmon	Mount Lemmon Survey	·	1.8 km	MPC · JPL
527737	2007 YG_{77}	—	December 30, 2007	Mount Lemmon	Mount Lemmon Survey	·	2.0 km	MPC · JPL
527738	2007 YK_{77}	—	December 30, 2007	Mount Lemmon	Mount Lemmon Survey	·	2.9 km	MPC · JPL
527739	2007 YR_{77}	—	December 14, 2007	Mount Lemmon	Mount Lemmon Survey	·	1.0 km	MPC · JPL
527740	2007 YS_{77}	—	December 31, 2007	Mount Lemmon	Mount Lemmon Survey	HYG	2.2 km	MPC · JPL
527741	2008 AS_{3}	—	January 9, 2008	Eskridge	G. Hug	·	760 m	MPC · JPL
527742	2008 AF_{9}	—	October 21, 2003	Kitt Peak	Spacewatch	·	640 m	MPC · JPL
527743	2008 AP_{9}	—	October 31, 2006	Kitt Peak	Spacewatch	·	1.7 km	MPC · JPL
527744	2008 AO_{11}	—	January 10, 2008	Mount Lemmon	Mount Lemmon Survey	EUP	3.1 km	MPC · JPL
527745	2008 AB_{12}	—	January 10, 2008	Mount Lemmon	Mount Lemmon Survey	·	2.5 km	MPC · JPL
527746	2008 AZ_{12}	—	January 10, 2008	Mount Lemmon	Mount Lemmon Survey	·	2.4 km	MPC · JPL
527747	2008 AD_{15}	—	December 15, 2007	Mount Lemmon	Mount Lemmon Survey	NYS	710 m	MPC · JPL
527748	2008 AG_{15}	—	January 10, 2008	Kitt Peak	Spacewatch	H	530 m	MPC · JPL
527749	2008 AK_{17}	—	December 30, 2007	Kitt Peak	Spacewatch	·	950 m	MPC · JPL
527750	2008 AF_{18}	—	December 30, 2007	Mount Lemmon	Mount Lemmon Survey	TIR	2.5 km	MPC · JPL
527751	2008 AL_{18}	—	January 10, 2008	Mount Lemmon	Mount Lemmon Survey	LIX	3.0 km	MPC · JPL
527752	2008 AN_{18}	—	January 10, 2008	Mount Lemmon	Mount Lemmon Survey	MAS	660 m	MPC · JPL
527753	2008 AB_{19}	—	January 10, 2008	Mount Lemmon	Mount Lemmon Survey	·	830 m	MPC · JPL
527754	2008 AK_{19}	—	January 10, 2008	Mount Lemmon	Mount Lemmon Survey	NYS	810 m	MPC · JPL
527755	2008 AT_{24}	—	January 10, 2008	Mount Lemmon	Mount Lemmon Survey	·	2.1 km	MPC · JPL
527756	2008 AP_{31}	—	January 7, 2008	La Sagra	OAM	·	2.9 km	MPC · JPL
527757	2008 AJ_{36}	—	December 30, 2007	Mount Lemmon	Mount Lemmon Survey	·	1.9 km	MPC · JPL
527758	2008 AD_{40}	—	December 14, 2007	Mount Lemmon	Mount Lemmon Survey	·	2.1 km	MPC · JPL
527759	2008 AV_{42}	—	December 18, 2007	Mount Lemmon	Mount Lemmon Survey	·	4.5 km	MPC · JPL
527760	2008 AW_{43}	—	January 10, 2008	Kitt Peak	Spacewatch	·	1.1 km	MPC · JPL
527761	2008 AG_{46}	—	December 20, 2007	Kitt Peak	Spacewatch	·	860 m	MPC · JPL
527762	2008 AW_{48}	—	January 11, 2008	Kitt Peak	Spacewatch	NYS	940 m	MPC · JPL
527763	2008 AB_{49}	—	December 3, 2007	Kitt Peak	Spacewatch	EMA	2.6 km	MPC · JPL
527764	2008 AT_{49}	—	January 1, 2008	Kitt Peak	Spacewatch	·	1.6 km	MPC · JPL
527765	2008 AP_{52}	—	January 11, 2008	Kitt Peak	Spacewatch	·	2.7 km	MPC · JPL
527766	2008 AZ_{54}	—	January 11, 2008	Kitt Peak	Spacewatch	MAS	610 m	MPC · JPL
527767	2008 AG_{57}	—	January 11, 2008	Kitt Peak	Spacewatch	·	820 m	MPC · JPL
527768	2008 AJ_{61}	—	May 12, 2005	Mount Lemmon	Mount Lemmon Survey	NYS	810 m	MPC · JPL
527769	2008 AB_{63}	—	January 11, 2008	Kitt Peak	Spacewatch	·	2.1 km	MPC · JPL
527770	2008 AC_{64}	—	January 11, 2008	Kitt Peak	Spacewatch	NYS	890 m	MPC · JPL
527771	2008 AT_{65}	—	January 11, 2008	Kitt Peak	Spacewatch	NYS	970 m	MPC · JPL
527772	2008 AN_{67}	—	November 18, 2007	Mount Lemmon	Mount Lemmon Survey	·	2.3 km	MPC · JPL
527773	2008 AT_{68}	—	January 11, 2008	Mount Lemmon	Mount Lemmon Survey	·	1.9 km	MPC · JPL
527774	2008 AP_{71}	—	December 14, 2007	Mount Lemmon	Mount Lemmon Survey	·	2.3 km	MPC · JPL
527775	2008 AM_{73}	—	January 10, 2008	Kitt Peak	Spacewatch	PHO	1.9 km	MPC · JPL
527776	2008 AR_{75}	—	January 11, 2008	Mount Lemmon	Mount Lemmon Survey	·	2.4 km	MPC · JPL
527777	2008 AM_{81}	—	January 12, 2008	Kitt Peak	Spacewatch	·	720 m	MPC · JPL
527778	2008 AZ_{81}	—	January 13, 2008	Mount Lemmon	Mount Lemmon Survey	·	1.8 km	MPC · JPL
527779	2008 AT_{87}	—	December 30, 2007	Kitt Peak	Spacewatch	NYS	750 m	MPC · JPL
527780	2008 AO_{88}	—	December 30, 2007	Kitt Peak	Spacewatch	·	3.7 km	MPC · JPL
527781	2008 AW_{89}	—	November 7, 2007	Mount Lemmon	Mount Lemmon Survey	·	2.5 km	MPC · JPL
527782	2008 AX_{93}	—	December 16, 2007	Mount Lemmon	Mount Lemmon Survey	·	2.3 km	MPC · JPL
527783	2008 AX_{97}	—	January 1, 2008	Kitt Peak	Spacewatch	·	2.7 km	MPC · JPL
527784	2008 AB_{100}	—	January 14, 2008	Kitt Peak	Spacewatch	PHO	750 m	MPC · JPL
527785	2008 AJ_{102}	—	January 13, 2008	Kitt Peak	Spacewatch	·	970 m	MPC · JPL
527786	2008 AN_{103}	—	November 11, 2007	Mount Lemmon	Mount Lemmon Survey	V	600 m	MPC · JPL
527787	2008 AT_{103}	—	December 18, 2007	Mount Lemmon	Mount Lemmon Survey	·	3.0 km	MPC · JPL
527788	2008 AU_{103}	—	December 5, 2007	Kitt Peak	Spacewatch	·	2.5 km	MPC · JPL
527789	2008 AT_{104}	—	January 1, 2008	Kitt Peak	Spacewatch	·	2.5 km	MPC · JPL
527790	2008 AZ_{106}	—	December 31, 2007	Mount Lemmon	Mount Lemmon Survey	·	1.4 km	MPC · JPL
527791	2008 AB_{107}	—	January 15, 2008	Kitt Peak	Spacewatch	TIR	2.5 km	MPC · JPL
527792	2008 AY_{112}	—	May 24, 2001	Kitt Peak	Spacewatch	·	2.2 km	MPC · JPL
527793	2008 AJ_{113}	—	September 28, 2006	Kitt Peak	Spacewatch	·	3.7 km	MPC · JPL
527794	2008 AL_{116}	—	January 14, 2008	Kitt Peak	Spacewatch	·	2.2 km	MPC · JPL
527795	2008 AP_{116}	—	January 11, 2008	Kitt Peak	Spacewatch	·	2.2 km	MPC · JPL
527796	2008 AR_{116}	—	January 11, 2008	Mount Lemmon	Mount Lemmon Survey	·	3.1 km	MPC · JPL
527797	2008 AK_{117}	—	January 1, 2008	Kitt Peak	Spacewatch	·	2.6 km	MPC · JPL
527798	2008 AM_{117}	—	January 11, 2008	Catalina	CSS	PHO	2.1 km	MPC · JPL
527799	2008 AG_{118}	—	January 13, 2008	Kitt Peak	Spacewatch	·	1.4 km	MPC · JPL
527800	2008 AB_{130}	—	October 13, 2006	Kitt Peak	Spacewatch	·	1.9 km	MPC · JPL

== 527801–527900 ==
back to top

Designation			Discovery			Properties		Ref
Permanent	Provisional	Named after	Date	Site	Discoverer(s)	Category	Diam.	Ref
527801	2008 AT_{134}	—	January 10, 2008	Kitt Peak	Spacewatch	·	2.6 km	MPC · JPL
527802	2008 AU_{135}	—	January 11, 2008	Socorro	LINEAR	·	1.1 km	MPC · JPL
527803	2008 AD_{136}	—	January 12, 2008	Catalina	CSS	T_{j} (2.94)	3.2 km	MPC · JPL
527804	2008 AT_{137}	—	January 10, 2008	Kitt Peak	Spacewatch	THM	2.1 km	MPC · JPL
527805	2008 AW_{138}	—	October 19, 2006	Mount Lemmon	Mount Lemmon Survey	·	2.8 km	MPC · JPL
527806	2008 AD_{139}	—	January 1, 2008	Kitt Peak	Spacewatch	V	700 m	MPC · JPL
527807	2008 AE_{139}	—	October 2, 2006	Kitt Peak	Spacewatch	·	2.2 km	MPC · JPL
527808	2008 AF_{139}	—	January 14, 2008	Kitt Peak	Spacewatch	·	2.4 km	MPC · JPL
527809	2008 AJ_{139}	—	January 10, 2008	Mount Lemmon	Mount Lemmon Survey	·	1.7 km	MPC · JPL
527810	2008 AM_{139}	—	January 10, 2008	Mount Lemmon	Mount Lemmon Survey	VER	2.3 km	MPC · JPL
527811	2008 AS_{139}	—	January 11, 2008	Mount Lemmon	Mount Lemmon Survey	·	3.6 km	MPC · JPL
527812	2008 AX_{139}	—	January 13, 2008	Mount Lemmon	Mount Lemmon Survey	·	2.2 km	MPC · JPL
527813	2008 BA	—	December 31, 2007	Kitt Peak	Spacewatch	H	520 m	MPC · JPL
527814	2008 BB_{6}	—	December 18, 2007	Mount Lemmon	Mount Lemmon Survey	EUP	3.2 km	MPC · JPL
527815	2008 BH_{7}	—	January 16, 2008	Kitt Peak	Spacewatch	·	820 m	MPC · JPL
527816	2008 BF_{11}	—	January 18, 2008	Kitt Peak	Spacewatch	·	1.9 km	MPC · JPL
527817	2008 BR_{16}	—	January 29, 2008	La Sagra	OAM	H	560 m	MPC · JPL
527818	2008 BN_{27}	—	January 11, 2008	Kitt Peak	Spacewatch	·	2.8 km	MPC · JPL
527819	2008 BY_{34}	—	January 30, 2008	Mount Lemmon	Mount Lemmon Survey	·	1.1 km	MPC · JPL
527820	2008 BP_{36}	—	January 30, 2008	Kitt Peak	Spacewatch	·	2.0 km	MPC · JPL
527821	2008 BW_{36}	—	December 30, 2007	Kitt Peak	Spacewatch	NYS	1.2 km	MPC · JPL
527822	2008 BK_{38}	—	January 31, 2008	Mount Lemmon	Mount Lemmon Survey	·	2.3 km	MPC · JPL
527823	2008 BZ_{41}	—	November 21, 2007	Mount Lemmon	Mount Lemmon Survey	·	2.0 km	MPC · JPL
527824	2008 BE_{46}	—	January 30, 2008	Mount Lemmon	Mount Lemmon Survey	THM	1.7 km	MPC · JPL
527825	2008 BE_{47}	—	January 31, 2008	Mount Lemmon	Mount Lemmon Survey	·	990 m	MPC · JPL
527826	2008 BR_{47}	—	January 31, 2008	Mount Lemmon	Mount Lemmon Survey	·	2.4 km	MPC · JPL
527827	2008 BY_{47}	—	January 30, 2008	Mount Lemmon	Mount Lemmon Survey	MAS	690 m	MPC · JPL
527828	2008 BG_{53}	—	January 19, 2008	Kitt Peak	Spacewatch	·	2.7 km	MPC · JPL
527829	2008 BR_{53}	—	July 21, 2006	Mount Lemmon	Mount Lemmon Survey	·	1.1 km	MPC · JPL
527830	2008 BU_{53}	—	January 30, 2008	Mount Lemmon	Mount Lemmon Survey	·	2.2 km	MPC · JPL
527831	2008 BS_{54}	—	January 30, 2008	Mount Lemmon	Mount Lemmon Survey	·	1.4 km	MPC · JPL
527832	2008 BX_{54}	—	January 18, 2008	Mount Lemmon	Mount Lemmon Survey	·	910 m	MPC · JPL
527833	2008 BY_{54}	—	January 17, 2008	Mount Lemmon	Mount Lemmon Survey	·	2.6 km	MPC · JPL
527834	2008 BZ_{54}	—	January 19, 2008	Mount Lemmon	Mount Lemmon Survey	·	2.2 km	MPC · JPL
527835	2008 BB_{55}	—	January 16, 2008	Mount Lemmon	Mount Lemmon Survey	·	1.7 km	MPC · JPL
527836	2008 BC_{55}	—	January 16, 2008	Mount Lemmon	Mount Lemmon Survey	·	2.6 km	MPC · JPL
527837	2008 BE_{55}	—	January 11, 2008	Catalina	CSS	·	2.2 km	MPC · JPL
527838	2008 BK_{55}	—	January 19, 2008	Mount Lemmon	Mount Lemmon Survey	·	2.9 km	MPC · JPL
527839	2008 BM_{55}	—	January 19, 2008	Mount Lemmon	Mount Lemmon Survey	(21885)	2.9 km	MPC · JPL
527840	2008 BR_{55}	—	January 30, 2008	Mount Lemmon	Mount Lemmon Survey	·	780 m	MPC · JPL
527841	2008 CR_{1}	—	February 3, 2008	Catalina	CSS	APO	430 m	MPC · JPL
527842	2008 CH_{2}	—	February 1, 2008	Kitt Peak	Spacewatch	MAS	540 m	MPC · JPL
527843	2008 CT_{9}	—	January 10, 2008	Kitt Peak	Spacewatch	·	3.0 km	MPC · JPL
527844	2008 CZ_{10}	—	February 3, 2008	Kitt Peak	Spacewatch	NYS	790 m	MPC · JPL
527845	2008 CL_{11}	—	February 3, 2008	Kitt Peak	Spacewatch	·	740 m	MPC · JPL
527846	2008 CO_{11}	—	February 3, 2008	Kitt Peak	Spacewatch	H	520 m	MPC · JPL
527847	2008 CO_{13}	—	November 11, 2007	Mount Lemmon	Mount Lemmon Survey	·	2.3 km	MPC · JPL
527848	2008 CL_{17}	—	February 3, 2008	Kitt Peak	Spacewatch	·	2.3 km	MPC · JPL
527849	2008 CP_{21}	—	February 2, 2008	Kitt Peak	Spacewatch	·	1.9 km	MPC · JPL
527850	2008 CS_{21}	—	December 31, 2007	Kitt Peak	Spacewatch	·	700 m	MPC · JPL
527851	2008 CL_{28}	—	January 16, 2008	Kitt Peak	Spacewatch	·	830 m	MPC · JPL
527852	2008 CB_{32}	—	February 2, 2008	Kitt Peak	Spacewatch	·	2.8 km	MPC · JPL
527853	2008 CE_{32}	—	February 2, 2008	Kitt Peak	Spacewatch	·	950 m	MPC · JPL
527854	2008 CU_{37}	—	December 15, 2006	Kitt Peak	Spacewatch	·	2.9 km	MPC · JPL
527855	2008 CU_{44}	—	February 2, 2008	Kitt Peak	Spacewatch	·	950 m	MPC · JPL
527856	2008 CQ_{46}	—	February 2, 2008	Kitt Peak	Spacewatch	AEG	2.4 km	MPC · JPL
527857	2008 CA_{55}	—	November 18, 2007	Mount Lemmon	Mount Lemmon Survey	·	2.7 km	MPC · JPL
527858	2008 CC_{56}	—	December 31, 2007	Kitt Peak	Spacewatch	·	1.6 km	MPC · JPL
527859	2008 CW_{56}	—	February 7, 2008	Mount Lemmon	Mount Lemmon Survey	·	2.2 km	MPC · JPL
527860	2008 CK_{58}	—	February 3, 2008	Kitt Peak	Spacewatch	·	3.1 km	MPC · JPL
527861	2008 CN_{59}	—	February 7, 2008	Mount Lemmon	Mount Lemmon Survey	·	760 m	MPC · JPL
527862	2008 CU_{60}	—	January 14, 2008	Kitt Peak	Spacewatch	·	2.4 km	MPC · JPL
527863	2008 CH_{61}	—	February 7, 2008	Mount Lemmon	Mount Lemmon Survey	·	2.6 km	MPC · JPL
527864	2008 CJ_{65}	—	February 8, 2008	Mount Lemmon	Mount Lemmon Survey	·	1.1 km	MPC · JPL
527865	2008 CQ_{66}	—	February 8, 2008	Mount Lemmon	Mount Lemmon Survey	·	840 m	MPC · JPL
527866	2008 CG_{72}	—	April 27, 2001	Kitt Peak	Spacewatch	·	880 m	MPC · JPL
527867	2008 CY_{72}	—	January 13, 2008	Catalina	CSS	EUP	3.5 km	MPC · JPL
527868	2008 CD_{75}	—	February 10, 2008	Catalina	CSS	·	2.7 km	MPC · JPL
527869	2008 CM_{76}	—	February 3, 2008	Kitt Peak	Spacewatch	EUP	4.2 km	MPC · JPL
527870	2008 CT_{78}	—	February 7, 2008	Kitt Peak	Spacewatch	H	540 m	MPC · JPL
527871	2008 CG_{80}	—	February 7, 2008	Kitt Peak	Spacewatch	·	4.3 km	MPC · JPL
527872	2008 CX_{85}	—	February 7, 2008	Mount Lemmon	Mount Lemmon Survey	·	2.2 km	MPC · JPL
527873	2008 CV_{90}	—	December 5, 2007	Mount Lemmon	Mount Lemmon Survey	LIX	2.8 km	MPC · JPL
527874	2008 CU_{99}	—	February 9, 2008	Kitt Peak	Spacewatch	·	1.7 km	MPC · JPL
527875	2008 CG_{103}	—	February 9, 2008	Kitt Peak	Spacewatch	·	2.6 km	MPC · JPL
527876	2008 CF_{107}	—	February 9, 2008	Mount Lemmon	Mount Lemmon Survey	·	3.3 km	MPC · JPL
527877	2008 CY_{117}	—	January 15, 2008	Mount Lemmon	Mount Lemmon Survey	·	2.5 km	MPC · JPL
527878	2008 CB_{118}	—	January 11, 2008	Kitt Peak	Spacewatch	·	2.6 km	MPC · JPL
527879	2008 CE_{121}	—	December 17, 2007	Kitt Peak	Spacewatch	·	1.5 km	MPC · JPL
527880	2008 CV_{122}	—	February 7, 2008	Mount Lemmon	Mount Lemmon Survey	NYS	990 m	MPC · JPL
527881	2008 CO_{123}	—	February 7, 2008	Mount Lemmon	Mount Lemmon Survey	·	980 m	MPC · JPL
527882	2008 CZ_{130}	—	February 8, 2008	Kitt Peak	Spacewatch	·	760 m	MPC · JPL
527883	2008 CT_{131}	—	February 8, 2008	Kitt Peak	Spacewatch	MAS	510 m	MPC · JPL
527884	2008 CU_{133}	—	January 30, 2008	Mount Lemmon	Mount Lemmon Survey	·	2.4 km	MPC · JPL
527885	2008 CE_{135}	—	February 8, 2008	Mount Lemmon	Mount Lemmon Survey	·	930 m	MPC · JPL
527886	2008 CO_{135}	—	February 8, 2008	Mount Lemmon	Mount Lemmon Survey	·	1.6 km	MPC · JPL
527887	2008 CU_{137}	—	February 1, 2008	Kitt Peak	Spacewatch	·	1.8 km	MPC · JPL
527888	2008 CW_{137}	—	February 8, 2008	Kitt Peak	Spacewatch	MAS	560 m	MPC · JPL
527889	2008 CW_{138}	—	January 30, 2008	Kitt Peak	Spacewatch	T_{j} (2.98)	2.0 km	MPC · JPL
527890	2008 CR_{144}	—	January 11, 2008	Mount Lemmon	Mount Lemmon Survey	·	2.6 km	MPC · JPL
527891	2008 CT_{145}	—	February 9, 2008	Kitt Peak	Spacewatch	·	870 m	MPC · JPL
527892	2008 CK_{146}	—	February 9, 2008	Kitt Peak	Spacewatch	·	1.8 km	MPC · JPL
527893	2008 CO_{150}	—	February 9, 2008	Kitt Peak	Spacewatch	·	990 m	MPC · JPL
527894	2008 CE_{154}	—	February 9, 2008	Kitt Peak	Spacewatch	·	1.2 km	MPC · JPL
527895	2008 CE_{159}	—	February 9, 2008	Catalina	CSS	EUP	3.5 km	MPC · JPL
527896	2008 CW_{165}	—	February 10, 2008	Mount Lemmon	Mount Lemmon Survey	·	1.1 km	MPC · JPL
527897	2008 CZ_{167}	—	February 11, 2008	Mount Lemmon	Mount Lemmon Survey	·	1.7 km	MPC · JPL
527898	2008 CV_{171}	—	February 12, 2008	Kitt Peak	Spacewatch	·	3.8 km	MPC · JPL
527899	2008 CF_{174}	—	February 13, 2008	Mount Lemmon	Mount Lemmon Survey	·	1.8 km	MPC · JPL
527900	2008 CB_{184}	—	November 22, 2006	Kitt Peak	Spacewatch	·	2.4 km	MPC · JPL

== 527901–528000 ==
back to top

Designation			Discovery			Properties		Ref
Permanent	Provisional	Named after	Date	Site	Discoverer(s)	Category	Diam.	Ref
527901	2008 CS_{188}	—	February 3, 2008	Catalina	CSS	THB	2.7 km	MPC · JPL
527902	2008 CM_{190}	—	February 8, 2008	Kitt Peak	Spacewatch	·	1.7 km	MPC · JPL
527903	2008 CJ_{192}	—	February 2, 2008	Kitt Peak	Spacewatch	V	540 m	MPC · JPL
527904	2008 CZ_{196}	—	February 8, 2008	Kitt Peak	Spacewatch	·	2.0 km	MPC · JPL
527905	2008 CS_{198}	—	February 12, 2008	Mount Lemmon	Mount Lemmon Survey	NYS	1.1 km	MPC · JPL
527906	2008 CU_{198}	—	February 12, 2008	Mount Lemmon	Mount Lemmon Survey	·	1.9 km	MPC · JPL
527907	2008 CK_{202}	—	February 7, 2008	Kitt Peak	Spacewatch	·	2.6 km	MPC · JPL
527908	2008 CB_{203}	—	February 9, 2008	Kitt Peak	Spacewatch	NYS	1.0 km	MPC · JPL
527909	2008 CN_{206}	—	February 9, 2008	Mount Lemmon	Mount Lemmon Survey	·	1.8 km	MPC · JPL
527910	2008 CX_{208}	—	February 13, 2008	Kitt Peak	Spacewatch	·	840 m	MPC · JPL
527911	2008 CJ_{210}	—	February 2, 2008	Kitt Peak	Spacewatch	MAS	520 m	MPC · JPL
527912	2008 CS_{211}	—	May 16, 2005	Mount Lemmon	Mount Lemmon Survey	PHO	800 m	MPC · JPL
527913	2008 CE_{214}	—	February 11, 2008	Kitt Peak	Spacewatch	THB	2.7 km	MPC · JPL
527914	2008 CX_{217}	—	February 7, 2008	Mount Lemmon	Mount Lemmon Survey	NYS	780 m	MPC · JPL
527915	2008 CD_{218}	—	February 10, 2008	Kitt Peak	Spacewatch	·	2.8 km	MPC · JPL
527916	2008 CL_{218}	—	October 28, 2006	Mount Lemmon	Mount Lemmon Survey	KOR	1.2 km	MPC · JPL
527917	2008 CS_{218}	—	February 8, 2008	Kitt Peak	Spacewatch	·	1.7 km	MPC · JPL
527918	2008 CG_{219}	—	February 2, 2008	Mount Lemmon	Mount Lemmon Survey	·	970 m	MPC · JPL
527919	2008 CO_{219}	—	February 13, 2008	Catalina	CSS	·	1.5 km	MPC · JPL
527920	2008 DQ	—	January 15, 2008	Mount Lemmon	Mount Lemmon Survey	·	2.9 km	MPC · JPL
527921	2008 DU_{1}	—	January 11, 2008	Kitt Peak	Spacewatch	·	890 m	MPC · JPL
527922	2008 DS_{3}	—	February 2, 2008	Catalina	CSS	H	510 m	MPC · JPL
527923	2008 DS_{6}	—	February 24, 2008	Mount Lemmon	Mount Lemmon Survey	LIX	2.6 km	MPC · JPL
527924	2008 DB_{8}	—	February 10, 2008	Kitt Peak	Spacewatch	·	2.3 km	MPC · JPL
527925	2008 DZ_{8}	—	January 12, 2008	Kitt Peak	Spacewatch	·	1.9 km	MPC · JPL
527926	2008 DT_{11}	—	January 13, 2008	Kitt Peak	Spacewatch	EOS	1.8 km	MPC · JPL
527927	2008 DT_{12}	—	January 14, 2008	Kitt Peak	Spacewatch	·	2.0 km	MPC · JPL
527928	2008 DU_{12}	—	January 19, 2008	Kitt Peak	Spacewatch	·	1.7 km	MPC · JPL
527929	2008 DS_{13}	—	November 18, 2007	Kitt Peak	Spacewatch	·	3.0 km	MPC · JPL
527930	2008 DC_{19}	—	January 16, 2008	Kitt Peak	Spacewatch	·	990 m	MPC · JPL
527931	2008 DV_{28}	—	January 12, 2008	Kitt Peak	Spacewatch	·	2.4 km	MPC · JPL
527932	2008 DQ_{35}	—	February 27, 2008	Kitt Peak	Spacewatch	·	2.7 km	MPC · JPL
527933	2008 DH_{42}	—	January 30, 2008	Mount Lemmon	Mount Lemmon Survey	·	1.4 km	MPC · JPL
527934	2008 DD_{49}	—	February 18, 2008	Mount Lemmon	Mount Lemmon Survey	·	1.2 km	MPC · JPL
527935	2008 DL_{49}	—	February 29, 2008	Catalina	CSS	·	3.7 km	MPC · JPL
527936	2008 DW_{50}	—	December 4, 2007	Mount Lemmon	Mount Lemmon Survey	·	2.8 km	MPC · JPL
527937	2008 DM_{58}	—	January 14, 2008	Kitt Peak	Spacewatch	·	2.1 km	MPC · JPL
527938	2008 DO_{58}	—	February 7, 2008	Catalina	CSS	·	2.2 km	MPC · JPL
527939	2008 DY_{58}	—	February 14, 2008	Mount Lemmon	Mount Lemmon Survey	H	390 m	MPC · JPL
527940	2008 DK_{69}	—	February 29, 2008	Purple Mountain	PMO NEO Survey Program	H	590 m	MPC · JPL
527941	2008 DE_{73}	—	January 30, 2008	Mount Lemmon	Mount Lemmon Survey	·	950 m	MPC · JPL
527942	2008 DA_{75}	—	February 26, 2008	Mount Lemmon	Mount Lemmon Survey	·	1.9 km	MPC · JPL
527943	2008 DC_{75}	—	February 11, 2008	Kitt Peak	Spacewatch	LIX	3.5 km	MPC · JPL
527944	2008 DL_{77}	—	February 8, 2008	Kitt Peak	Spacewatch	·	830 m	MPC · JPL
527945	2008 DG_{89}	—	February 28, 2008	Kitt Peak	Spacewatch	·	2.8 km	MPC · JPL
527946	2008 DD_{90}	—	February 18, 2008	Mount Lemmon	Mount Lemmon Survey	EMA	2.5 km	MPC · JPL
527947	2008 DJ_{90}	—	February 26, 2008	Mount Lemmon	Mount Lemmon Survey	NYS	1.1 km	MPC · JPL
527948	2008 DL_{90}	—	October 30, 2006	Catalina	CSS	·	1.6 km	MPC · JPL
527949	2008 EL_{8}	—	March 6, 2008	Mount Lemmon	Mount Lemmon Survey	H	410 m	MPC · JPL
527950	2008 EQ_{8}	—	January 18, 2008	Mount Lemmon	Mount Lemmon Survey	·	1.1 km	MPC · JPL
527951	2008 ET_{8}	—	January 9, 2008	Mount Lemmon	Mount Lemmon Survey	·	1.1 km	MPC · JPL
527952	2008 EH_{10}	—	March 1, 2008	Kitt Peak	Spacewatch	·	2.1 km	MPC · JPL
527953	2008 EB_{12}	—	February 10, 2008	Kitt Peak	Spacewatch	·	810 m	MPC · JPL
527954	2008 EU_{12}	—	March 1, 2008	Kitt Peak	Spacewatch	·	730 m	MPC · JPL
527955	2008 ET_{16}	—	March 1, 2008	Kitt Peak	Spacewatch	·	1.0 km	MPC · JPL
527956	2008 EW_{19}	—	February 13, 2008	Mount Lemmon	Mount Lemmon Survey	·	1.9 km	MPC · JPL
527957	2008 ET_{30}	—	October 11, 2005	Kitt Peak	Spacewatch	·	3.0 km	MPC · JPL
527958	2008 ER_{31}	—	February 8, 2008	Kitt Peak	Spacewatch	·	2.2 km	MPC · JPL
527959	2008 EB_{32}	—	March 10, 2008	Mount Lemmon	Mount Lemmon Survey	AMO	460 m	MPC · JPL
527960	2008 EL_{32}	—	January 1, 2008	Kitt Peak	Spacewatch	·	1.5 km	MPC · JPL
527961	2008 EY_{34}	—	March 2, 2008	Catalina	CSS	PHO	1.1 km	MPC · JPL
527962	2008 EG_{37}	—	March 4, 2008	Kitt Peak	Spacewatch	·	2.5 km	MPC · JPL
527963	2008 EO_{38}	—	March 4, 2008	Kitt Peak	Spacewatch	HYG	2.4 km	MPC · JPL
527964	2008 EH_{42}	—	March 4, 2008	Kitt Peak	Spacewatch	TIR	2.4 km	MPC · JPL
527965	2008 EY_{46}	—	March 5, 2008	Mount Lemmon	Mount Lemmon Survey	·	3.1 km	MPC · JPL
527966	2008 EZ_{49}	—	February 7, 2008	Kitt Peak	Spacewatch	·	2.2 km	MPC · JPL
527967	2008 EN_{53}	—	March 6, 2008	Mount Lemmon	Mount Lemmon Survey	·	2.2 km	MPC · JPL
527968	2008 EE_{55}	—	November 1, 2005	Mount Lemmon	Mount Lemmon Survey	·	3.6 km	MPC · JPL
527969	2008 ES_{55}	—	March 7, 2008	Mount Lemmon	Mount Lemmon Survey	V	500 m	MPC · JPL
527970	2008 EJ_{56}	—	February 8, 2008	Kitt Peak	Spacewatch	EOS	1.4 km	MPC · JPL
527971	2008 EC_{58}	—	March 7, 2008	Mount Lemmon	Mount Lemmon Survey	·	930 m	MPC · JPL
527972	2008 EE_{60}	—	February 13, 2008	Mount Lemmon	Mount Lemmon Survey	·	3.3 km	MPC · JPL
527973	2008 EJ_{61}	—	March 9, 2008	Mount Lemmon	Mount Lemmon Survey	EOS	1.6 km	MPC · JPL
527974	2008 EB_{65}	—	March 9, 2008	Mount Lemmon	Mount Lemmon Survey	PHO	790 m	MPC · JPL
527975	2008 EO_{65}	—	October 27, 2005	Kitt Peak	Spacewatch	·	2.2 km	MPC · JPL
527976	2008 EA_{66}	—	March 9, 2008	Mount Lemmon	Mount Lemmon Survey	H	410 m	MPC · JPL
527977	2008 EY_{68}	—	March 11, 2008	Socorro	LINEAR	ATE	120 m	MPC · JPL
527978	2008 EF_{72}	—	February 11, 2008	Mount Lemmon	Mount Lemmon Survey	LIX	2.7 km	MPC · JPL
527979	2008 EJ_{74}	—	February 28, 2008	Kitt Peak	Spacewatch	·	2.8 km	MPC · JPL
527980	2008 EH_{75}	—	February 28, 2008	Kitt Peak	Spacewatch	NYS	1.1 km	MPC · JPL
527981	2008 EY_{75}	—	February 28, 2008	Kitt Peak	Spacewatch	·	1.1 km	MPC · JPL
527982	2008 EK_{81}	—	February 2, 2008	Kitt Peak	Spacewatch	·	2.5 km	MPC · JPL
527983	2008 EP_{87}	—	March 1, 2008	Kitt Peak	Spacewatch	·	1.1 km	MPC · JPL
527984	2008 ER_{92}	—	March 3, 2008	Catalina	CSS	H	500 m	MPC · JPL
527985	2008 ES_{96}	—	February 26, 2008	Mount Lemmon	Mount Lemmon Survey	·	800 m	MPC · JPL
527986	2008 ER_{97}	—	March 11, 2008	Mount Lemmon	Mount Lemmon Survey	CYB	2.9 km	MPC · JPL
527987	2008 EW_{103}	—	February 8, 2008	Kitt Peak	Spacewatch	·	2.0 km	MPC · JPL
527988	2008 EX_{109}	—	January 31, 2008	Mount Lemmon	Mount Lemmon Survey	·	910 m	MPC · JPL
527989	2008 EY_{109}	—	February 26, 2008	Mount Lemmon	Mount Lemmon Survey	VER	2.6 km	MPC · JPL
527990	2008 EW_{110}	—	March 1, 2008	Kitt Peak	Spacewatch	·	1.9 km	MPC · JPL
527991	2008 ER_{112}	—	March 8, 2008	Kitt Peak	Spacewatch	·	2.0 km	MPC · JPL
527992	2008 EF_{114}	—	March 8, 2008	Kitt Peak	Spacewatch	KON	2.4 km	MPC · JPL
527993	2008 EC_{118}	—	February 13, 2008	Kitt Peak	Spacewatch	EOS	1.4 km	MPC · JPL
527994	2008 EB_{119}	—	February 28, 2008	Mount Lemmon	Mount Lemmon Survey	·	1.5 km	MPC · JPL
527995	2008 EX_{121}	—	March 1, 2008	Kitt Peak	Spacewatch	·	2.6 km	MPC · JPL
527996	2008 EX_{123}	—	January 18, 2008	Mount Lemmon	Mount Lemmon Survey	·	2.9 km	MPC · JPL
527997	2008 EH_{124}	—	March 10, 2008	Kitt Peak	Spacewatch	·	720 m	MPC · JPL
527998	2008 ED_{126}	—	March 10, 2008	Kitt Peak	Spacewatch	H	530 m	MPC · JPL
527999	2008 EO_{129}	—	March 11, 2008	Kitt Peak	Spacewatch	·	4.0 km	MPC · JPL
528000	2008 ES_{130}	—	February 2, 2008	Mount Lemmon	Mount Lemmon Survey	·	2.1 km	MPC · JPL

back to top

== Meaning of names ==
As minor planet discoveries are confirmed, they are given a permanent number by the IAU's Minor Planet Center (MPC), and the discoverers can then submit names for them, following the IAU's naming conventions. The list below concerns those minor planets in the specified number-range that have received names, and explains the meanings of those names.

Official naming citations of newly named small Solar System bodies are approved and published in a bulletin by IAU's Working Group for Small Bodies Nomenclature (WGSBN). Before May 2021, citations were published in MPC's Minor Planet Circulars for many decades. Recent citations can also be found on the JPL Small-Body Database (SBDB). Until his death in 2016, German astronomer Lutz D. Schmadel compiled these citations into the Dictionary of Minor Planet Names (DMP) and regularly updated the collection.

Based on Paul Herget's The Names of the Minor Planets, Schmadel also researched the unclear origin of numerous asteroids, most of which had been named prior to World War II. This article incorporates text from this source, which is in the public domain: SBDB New namings may only be added to this list below after official publication as the preannouncement of names is condemned. The WGSBN publishes a comprehensive guideline for the naming rules of non-cometary small Solar System bodies.

Named minor planet	Provisional	This minor planet was named for...	Ref · Catalog
527205 Zhongdatianwen	2007 TL_{178}	?	? 527205
