= (527603) 2007 VJ305 =

Object in outer Solar System

(527603) 2007 VJ_{305}
Discovery
- Discovered by: A. C. Becker; A. W. Puckett; J. Kubica
- Discovery site: Apache Point Obs.
- Discovery date: 4 November 2007

Designations
- Minor planet category: TNO · ESDO p-DP · ETNO distant

Orbital characteristics
- Epoch 27 April 2019 (JD 2458600.5)
- Uncertainty parameter 2
- Observation arc: 17.19 yr (6,278 d)
- Aphelion: 346.97 AU
- Perihelion: 35.147 AU
- Semi-major axis: 191.06 AU
- Eccentricity: 0.8160
- Orbital period (sidereal): 2640.9 yr (964,601 d)
- Mean anomaly: 1.8326°
- Mean motion: 0° 0^{m} 1.44^{s} / day
- Inclination: 11.993°
- Longitude of ascending node: 24.377°
- Argument of perihelion: 338.10°
- Neptune MOID: 5.4 AU

Physical characteristics
- Mean diameter: 202 km (est.); 279 km (est.)
- Geometric albedo: 0.04 (assumed); 0.09 (assumed)
- Spectral type: IR; B–I = 1.960; B–R = 1.440; R–I = 0.520; V–R = 0.520
- Absolute magnitude (H): 6.9

(527603) 2007 VJ_{305} is an extreme trans-Neptunian object from the extended scattered disc on a highly eccentric orbit in the outermost region of the Solar System. It measures approximately 250 kilometers (160 miles) in diameter. The reddish extended scattered disc object belongs to the group of extreme trans-Neptunian objects. It was discovered on 4 November 2007 by astronomers Andrew Becker, Andrew Puckett and Jeremy Kubica at the Apache Point Observatory in New Mexico, United States.

== Orbit and classification ==
2007 VJ_{305} orbits the Sun at a distance of 35.1–347 AU once every 2640 years and 11 months (964,601 days; semi-major axis of 191.1 AU). Its orbit has an exceptionally high eccentricity of 0.82 and an inclination of 12° with respect to the ecliptic. The body's observation arc begins with a precovery taken during the Sloan Digital Sky Survey at Apache Point in November 2000. It has a minimum orbital intersection distance with Neptune of 5.4 AU.

It belongs to a small group of detached objects with perihelion distances of 30 AU or more, and semi-major axes of 150 AU or more. These extreme trans-Neptunian objects (ETNOs) can not reach such orbits without some perturbing object, which leads to the speculation of Planet Nine.

== Numbering and naming ==
2007 VJ_{305} was numbered by the Minor Planet Center on 18 May 2019 (M.P.C. 114650). As of 2025, it has not been named.

== Physical characteristics ==
2007 VJ_{305}'s color is reddish with an intermediary IR spectral type and a B–R color index of 1.44.

=== Diameter and albedo ===
According to Johnston's Archive and to American astronomer Michael Brown, 2007 VJ_{305} measures 202 and 279 kilometers in diameter based on an assumed albedo of 0.09 and 0.04, respectively.

=== Rotation period and shape ===
As of 2019, no rotational lightcurve has been obtained from photometric observations. The body's rotation period, pole and shape remain unknown.
