= Timeline of Solar System exploration =

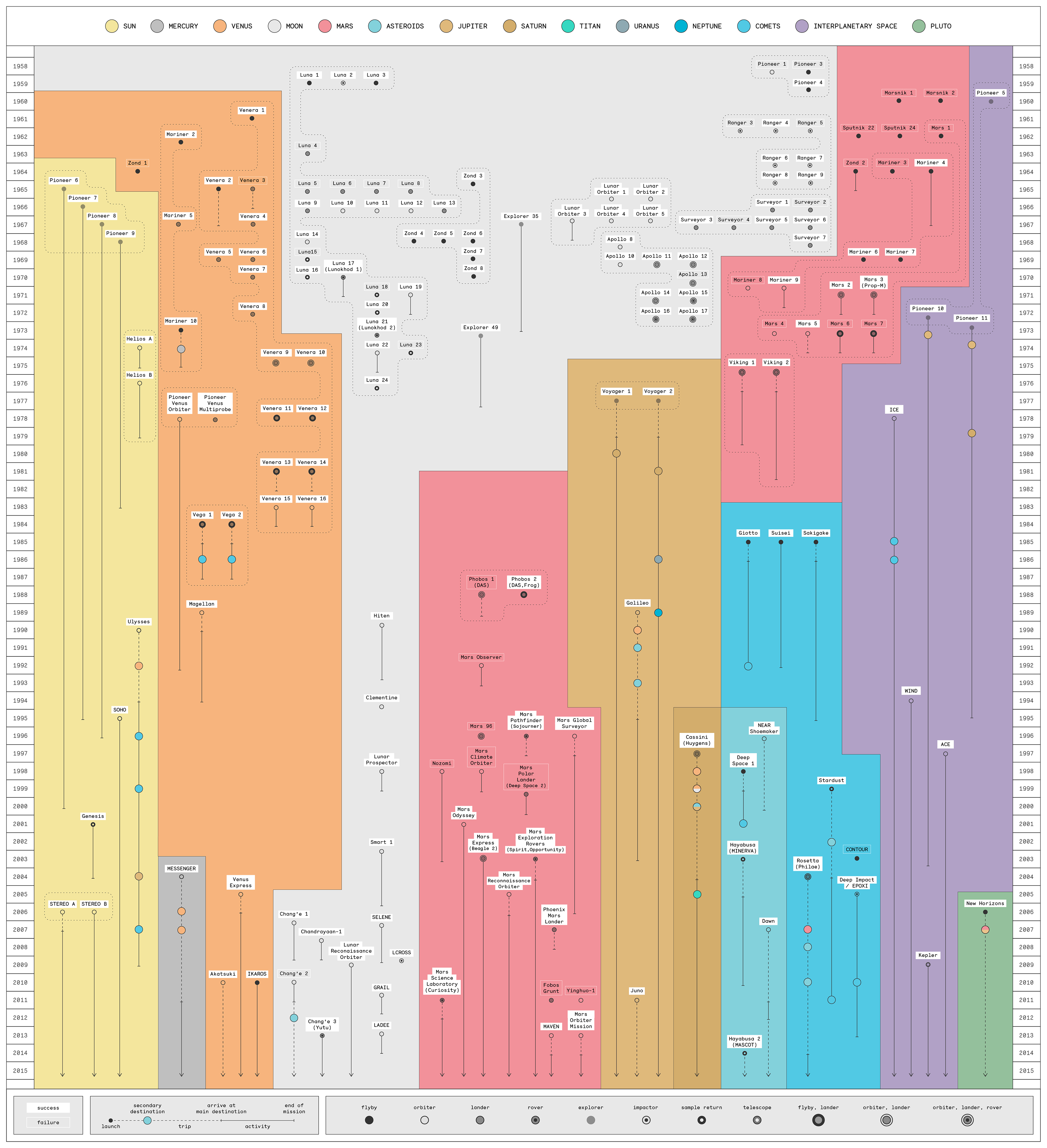
Charted timeline of Solar System exploration through December 2014

This is a timeline of Solar System exploration ordering events in the exploration of the Solar System by date of spacecraft launch. It includes:

- All spacecraft that have left Earth orbit for the purposes of Solar System exploration (or were launched with that intention but failed), including lunar probes.
- A small number of pioneering or notable Earth-orbiting spacecraft.

It does not include:

- Centuries of terrestrial telescopic observation.
- The great majority of Earth-orbiting satellites.
- Space probes leaving Earth orbit that are not concerned with Solar System exploration (such as space telescopes targeted at distant galaxies, cosmic background radiation observatories, and so on).
- Probes that failed at launch.

The dates listed are launch dates, but the achievements noted may have occurred some time later—in some cases, a considerable time later (for example, Voyager 2, launched 20 August 1977, did not reach Neptune until 1989).

== 1950s ==
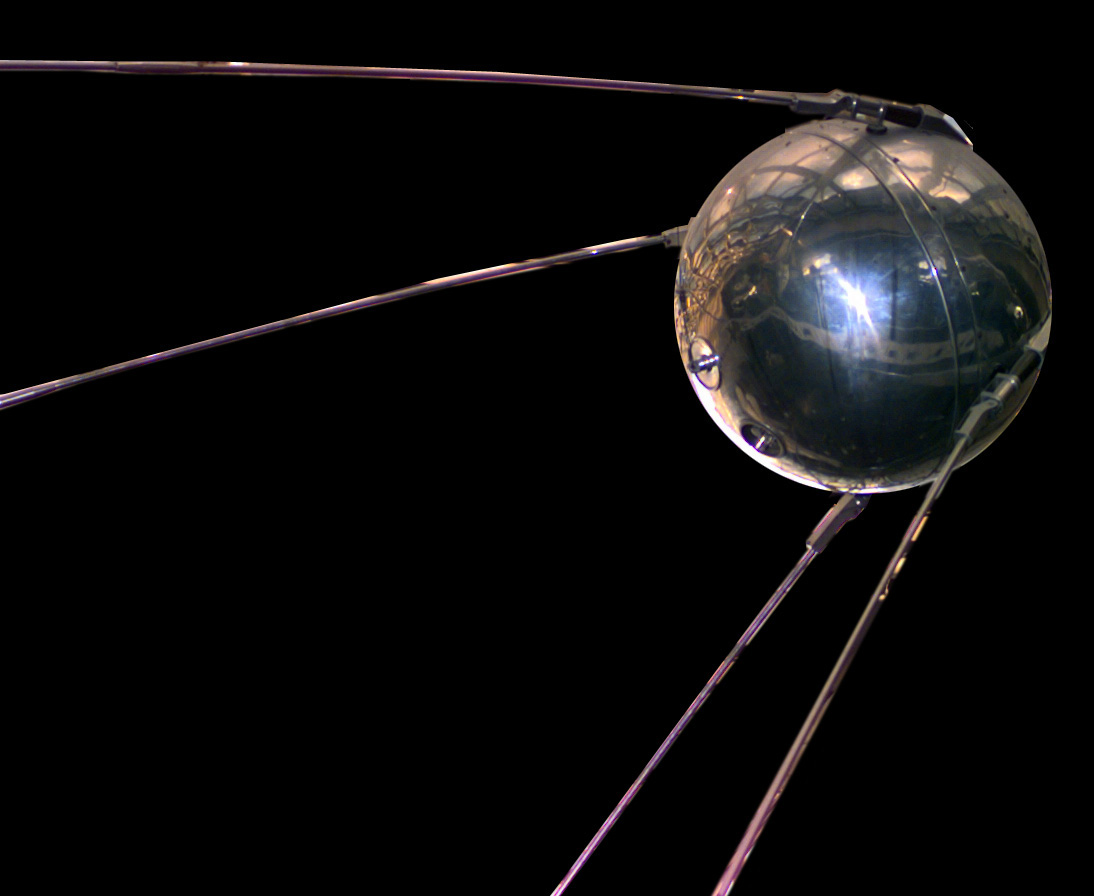
Sputnik 1 – first Earth orbiter

Mission name	Launch date	Description	Ref(s)
(Soviet Union) Sputnik 1	4 October 1957	First Earth orbiter	
(Soviet Union) Sputnik 2	3 November 1957	Earth orbiter, first animal in orbit, a dog named Laika	
(United States) Explorer 1	1 February 1958	Earth orbiter; discovered Van Allen radiation belts	
(United States) Vanguard 1	17 March 1958	Earth orbiter; oldest spacecraft still in Earth orbit	
(Soviet Union) Luna 1	2 January 1959	First lunar flyby (failed lunar impact); first artificial satellite in heliocentric orbit.	
(United States) Pioneer 4	3 March 1959	Lunar flyby	
(Soviet Union) Luna 2	12 September 1959	First extraterrestrial impact and lunar impact, First artificial object on Moon	
(Soviet Union) Luna 3	4 October 1959	Lunar flyby; First images of another celestial body taken from space, most notably, the far side of Moon	

== 1960s ==
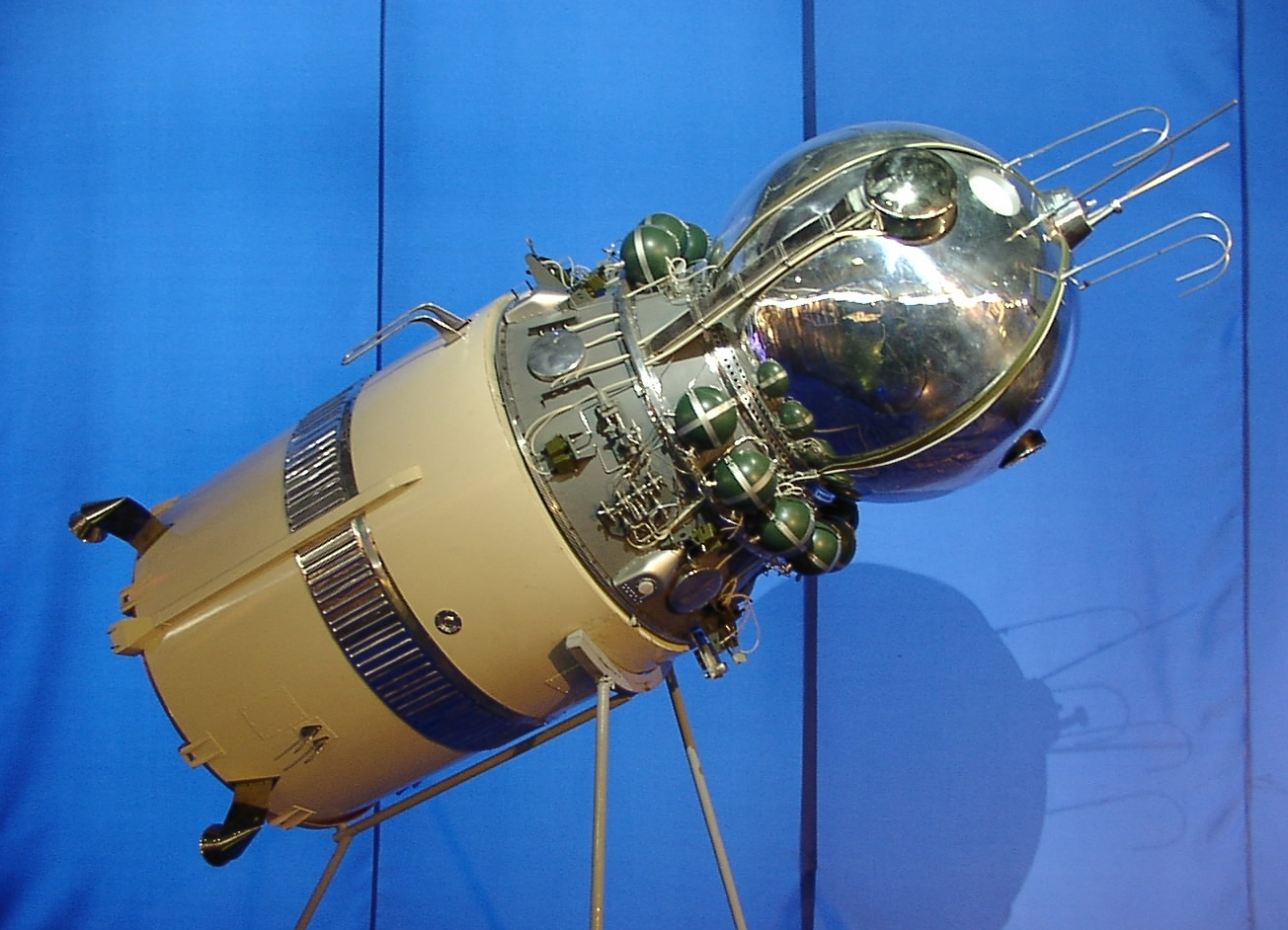
Vostok 1 – first crewed Earth orbiter

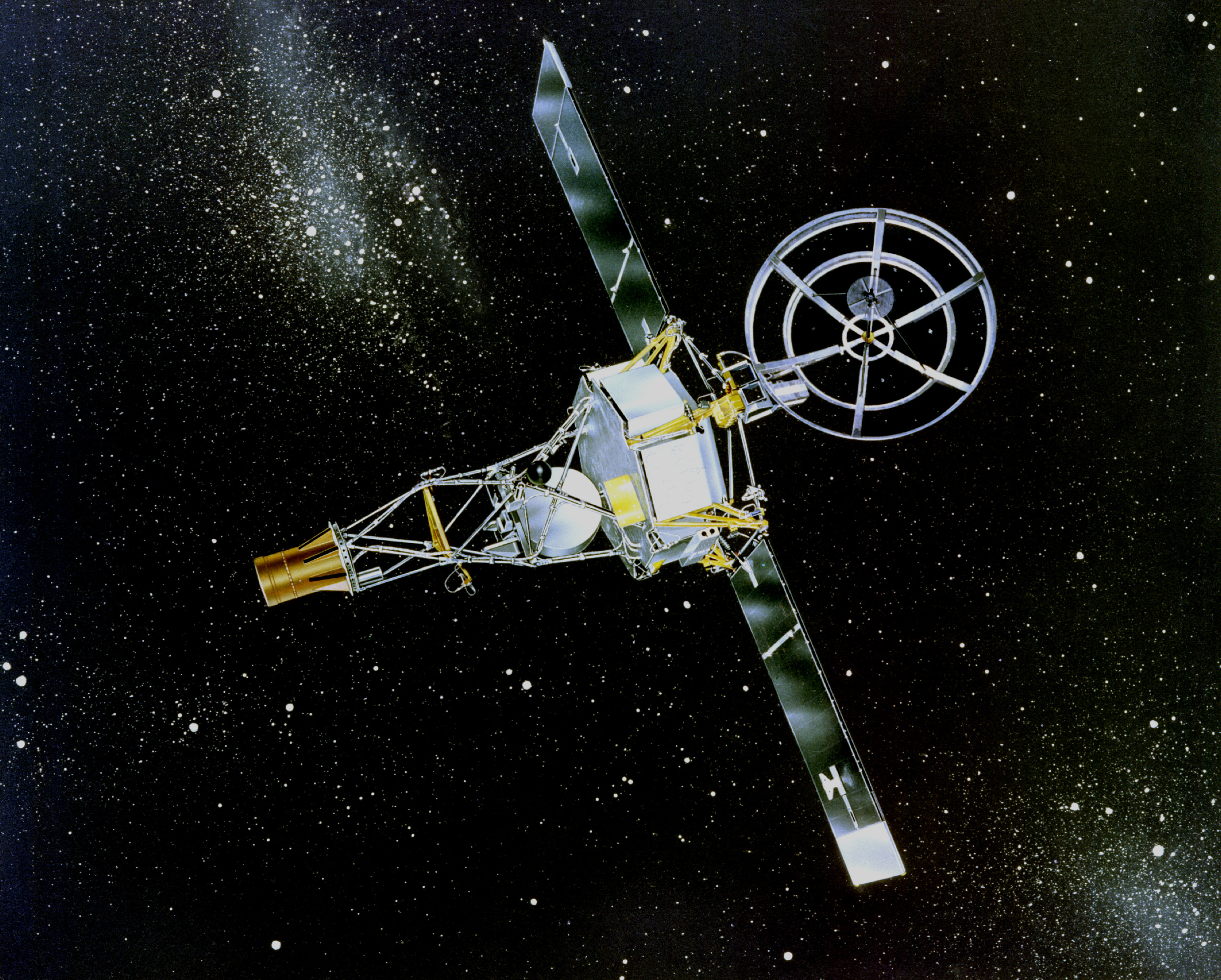
Mariner 2 – first successful Venus flyby

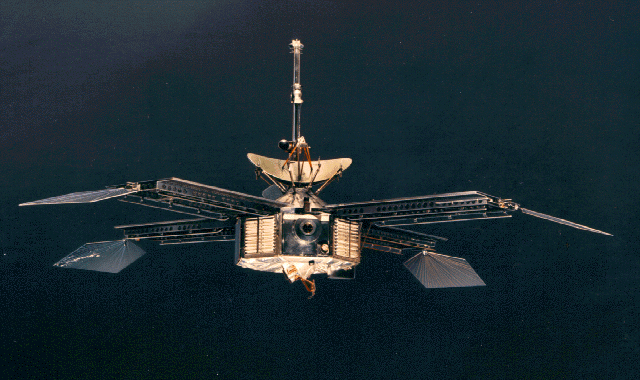
Mariner 4 – first successful Mars flyby

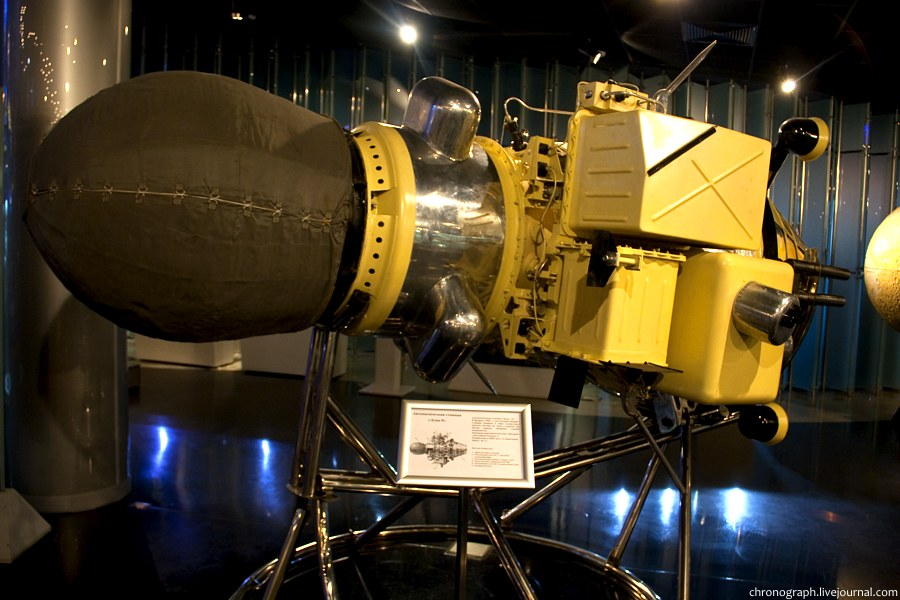
Luna 9 – first successful lunar lander

Zond 5 – first lunar flyby and return to Earth, first terrestrials to circle the Moon

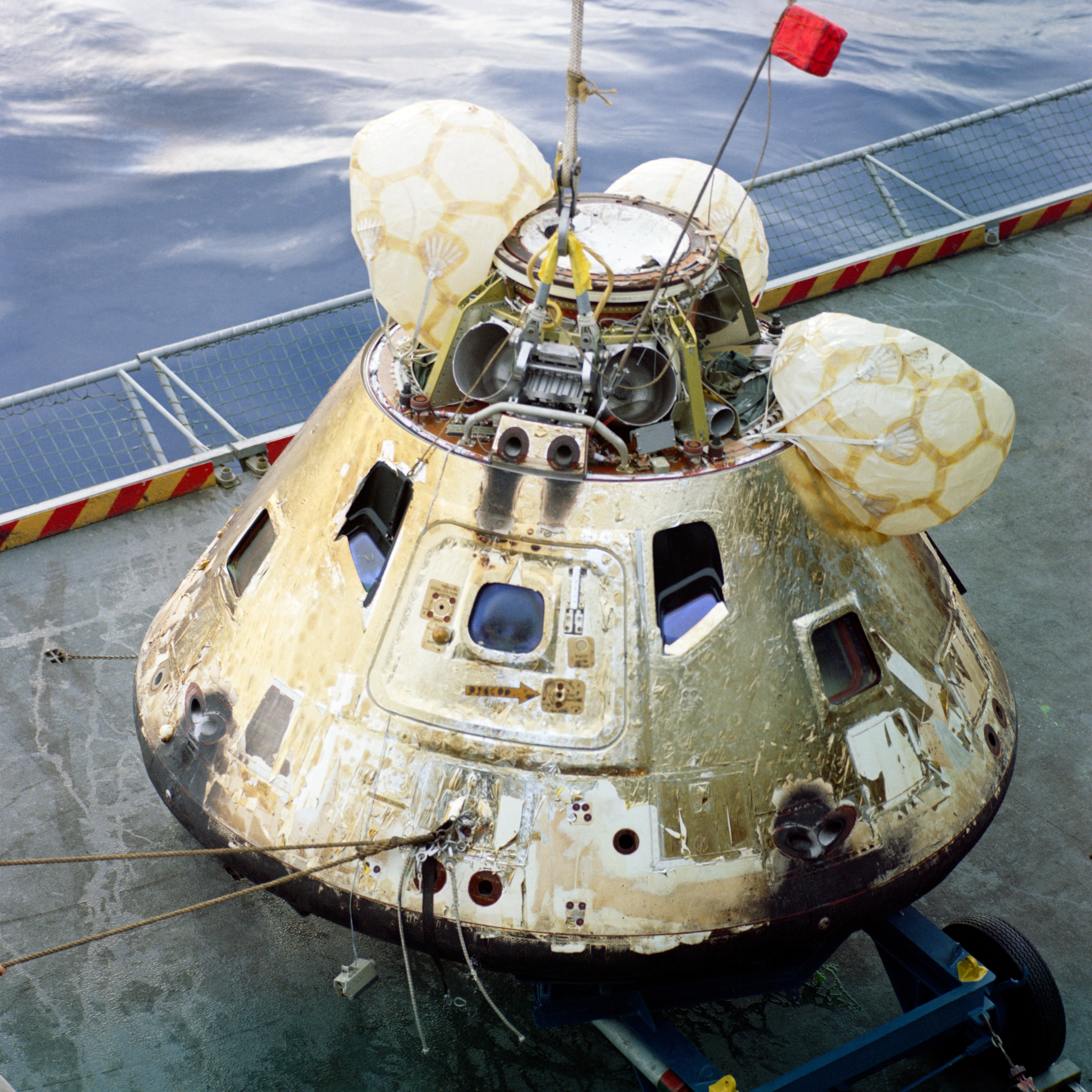
Apollo 8 – first crewed lunar orbiter

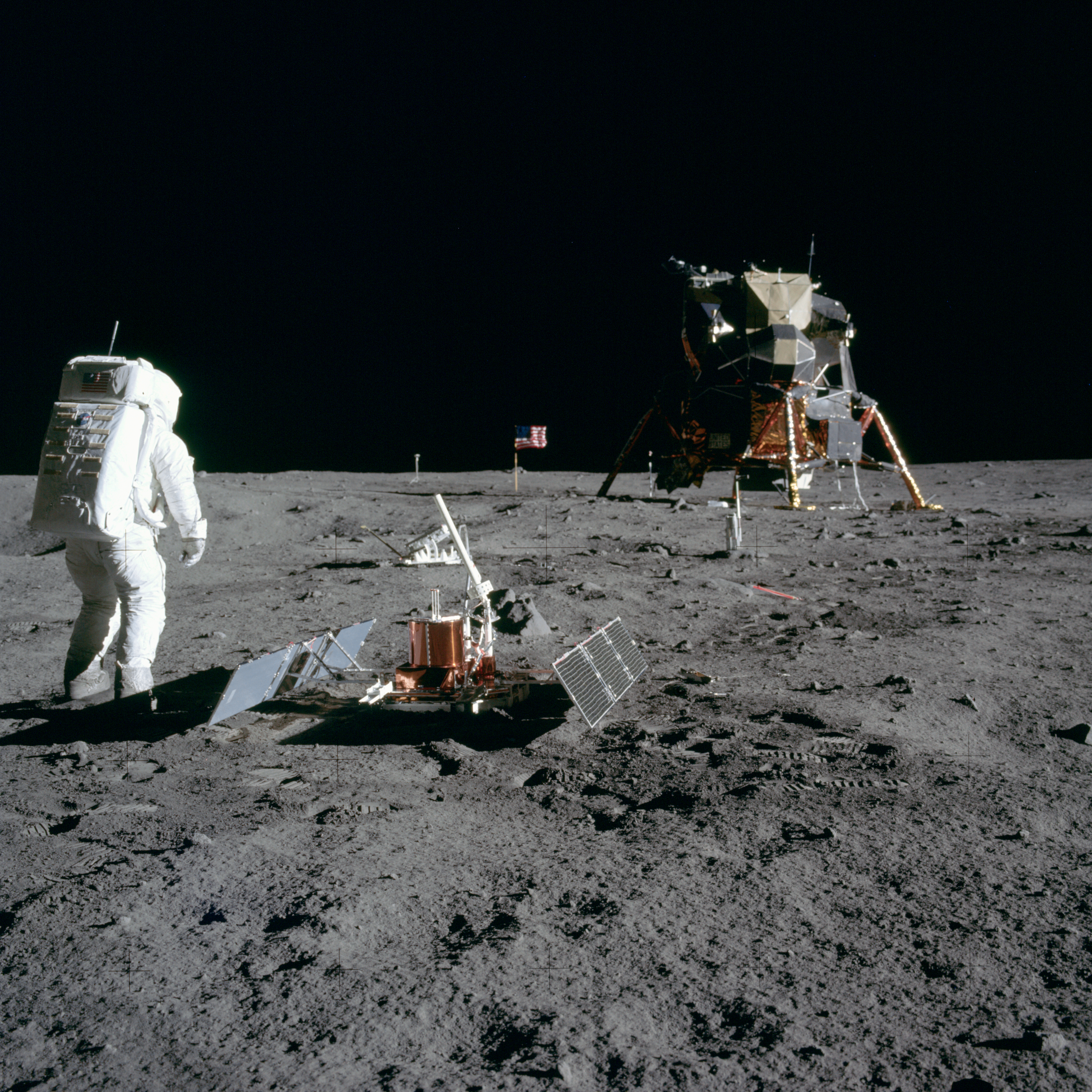
Apollo 11 – first crewed lunar landing

Mission name	Launch date	Description	Ref(s)
(United States) Pioneer 5	11 March 1960	Interplanetary space investigations	
(Soviet Union) Venera 1	12 February 1961	First probe to another planet; Venus flyby (contact lost before flyby)	
(Soviet Union) Vostok 1	12 April 1961	First crewed Earth orbiter (Yuri Gagarin)	
(United States) Ranger 1	23 August 1961	Attempted lunar test flight (failed to leave Earth orbit)	
(United States) Ranger 2	18 November 1961	Attempted lunar test flight (failed to leave Earth orbit)	
(United States) Ranger 3	26 January 1962	Attempted lunar impact (missed Moon)	
(United States) Ranger 4	23 April 1962	Lunar impact (but unintentionally became the first spacecraft to hit the lunar farside and returned no data)	
(United States) Mariner 2	27 August 1962	First successful planetary encounter, First successful Venus flyby	
(United States) Ranger 5	18 October 1962	Attempted lunar impact (missed Moon)	
(Soviet Union) Mars 1	1 November 1962	First probe to Mars: flyby (contact lost)	
(Soviet Union) Luna 4	2 April 1963	Attempted lunar lander (missed Moon)	
(Soviet Union) Cosmos 21	11 November 1963	Attempted Venera test flight?	
(United States) Ranger 6	30 January 1964	Lunar impact (cameras failed)	
(Soviet Union) Zond 1	2 April 1964	Venus flyby (contact lost)	
(United States) Ranger 7	28 July 1964	Lunar impact (success)	
(Soviet Union) Voskhod 1	12 October 1964	First orbiter with multimember crew	
(United States) Mariner 3	5 November 1964	Attempted Mars flyby (failed to attain correct trajectory)	
(United States) Mariner 4	28 November 1964	First successful Mars flyby (taking the first close-up image of another planet)	
(Soviet Union) Zond 2	30 November 1964	Mars flyby (contact lost)	
(United States) Ranger 8	17 February 1965	Lunar impact	
(Soviet Union) Voskhod 2	18 March 1965	First space walk, by Alexei Leonov	
(United States) Ranger 9	21 March 1965	Lunar impact	
(United States) Lincoln Calibration Sphere 1	6 May 1965	Oldest spacecraft still in use	
(Soviet Union) Luna 5	9 May 1965	Lunar impact (attempted soft landing)	
(Soviet Union) Luna 6	8 June 1965	Attempted lunar lander (missed Moon)	
(Soviet Union) Zond 3	18 July 1965	Lunar flyby	
(Soviet Union) Luna 7	4 October 1965	Lunar impact (attempted soft landing)	
(Soviet Union) Venera 2	12 November 1965	Venus flyby (contact lost)	
(Soviet Union) Venera 3	16 November 1965	Venus lander (contact lost) – First spacecraft to reach another planet's atmosphere and surface, First Venus impact	
(Soviet Union) Luna 8	3 December 1965	Lunar impact (attempted soft landing?)	
(United States) Pioneer 6	16 December 1965	"Space weather" observations	
(Soviet Union) Luna 9	31 January 1966	First extraterrestrial lander and lunar lander	
(Soviet Union) Luna 10	31 March 1966	First extraterrestrial orbiter (except heliocentric) and first lunar orbiter	
(United States) Surveyor 1	30 May 1966	Lunar lander	
(United States) Explorer 33	1 July 1966	Attempted lunar orbiter (failed to attain lunar orbit)	
(United States) Lunar Orbiter 1	10 August 1966	Lunar orbiter	
(United States) Pioneer 7	17 August 1966	"Space weather" observations	
(Soviet Union) Luna 11	24 August 1966	Lunar orbiter	
(United States) Surveyor 2	20 September 1966	Attempted lunar lander (crashed into Moon)	
(Soviet Union) Luna 12	22 October 1966	Lunar orbiter	
(United States) Lunar Orbiter 2	6 November 1966	Lunar orbiter	
(Soviet Union) Luna 13	21 December 1966	Lunar lander	
(United States) Lunar Orbiter 3	5 February 1967	Lunar orbiter	
(United States) Surveyor 3	17 April 1967	Lunar lander	
(United States) Lunar Orbiter 4	4 May 1967	Lunar orbiter	
(Soviet Union) Venera 4	12 June 1967	First functioning extraterrestrial atmospheric probe (Venus)	
(United States) Mariner 5	14 June 1967	Venus flyby	
(United States) Surveyor 4	14 July 1967	Attempted lunar lander (crashed into Moon)	
(United States) Explorer 35 (IMP-E)	19 July 1967	Lunar orbiter	
(United States) Lunar Orbiter 5	1 August 1967	Lunar orbiter	
(United States) Surveyor 5	8 September 1967	Lunar lander	
(United States) Surveyor 6	7 November 1967	Lunar lander, first lift-off from an extraterrestrial body	
(United States) Apollo 4	9 November 1967	Lunar programme test flight in Earth orbit (uncrewed)	
(United States) Pioneer 8	13 December 1967	"Space weather" observations	
(United States) Surveyor 7	7 January 1968	Lunar lander	
(United States) Apollo 5	22 January 1968	Lunar programme test flight in Earth orbit (uncrewed)	
(Soviet Union) Zond 4	2 March 1968	Lunar programme test flight out of Earth orbit (uncrewed)	
(Soviet Union) Luna 14	7 April 1968	Lunar orbiter	
(Soviet Union) Zond 5	14 September 1968	First lunar flyby and return to Earth, first life forms to circle the Moon	
(United States) Apollo 7	11 October 1968	Lunar programme test flight in Earth orbit (crewed)	
(United States) Pioneer 9	8 November 1968	"Space weather" observations	
(Soviet Union) Zond 6	10 November 1968	Lunar flyby and return to Earth	
(United States) Apollo 8	21 December 1968	First crewed spacecraft to leave Earth orbit, first crewed lunar orbiter	
(Soviet Union) Venera 5	5 January 1969	Venus atmospheric probe	
(Soviet Union) Venera 6	10 January 1969	Venus atmospheric probe	
(United States) Mariner 6	25 February 1969	Mars flyby	
(United States) Apollo 9	3 March 1969	Crewed lunar lander (LEM) flight test in Earth orbit	
(United States) Mariner 7	27 March 1969	Mars flyby	
(United States) Apollo 10	18 May 1969	Crewed lunar orbiter	
(Soviet Union) Luna 15	13 July 1969	Second attempted lunar sample return	
(United States) Apollo 11	16 July 1969	First crewed lunar landing and first successful sample return mission	
(Soviet Union) Zond 7	7 August 1969	Lunar flyby and return to Earth	
(United States) Apollo 12	14 November 1969	Crewed lunar landing	

== 1970s ==
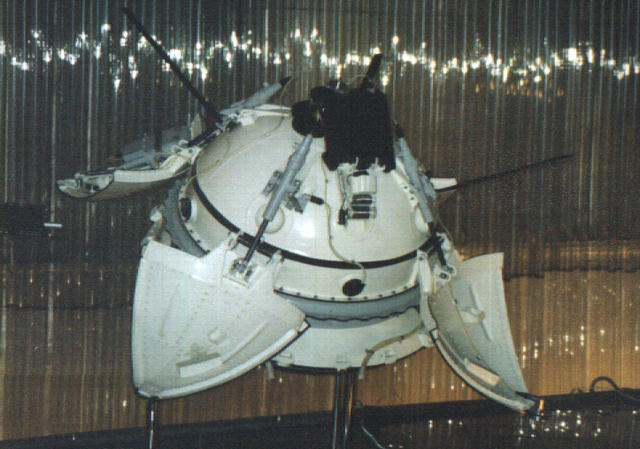
Mars 3 – first Mars lander

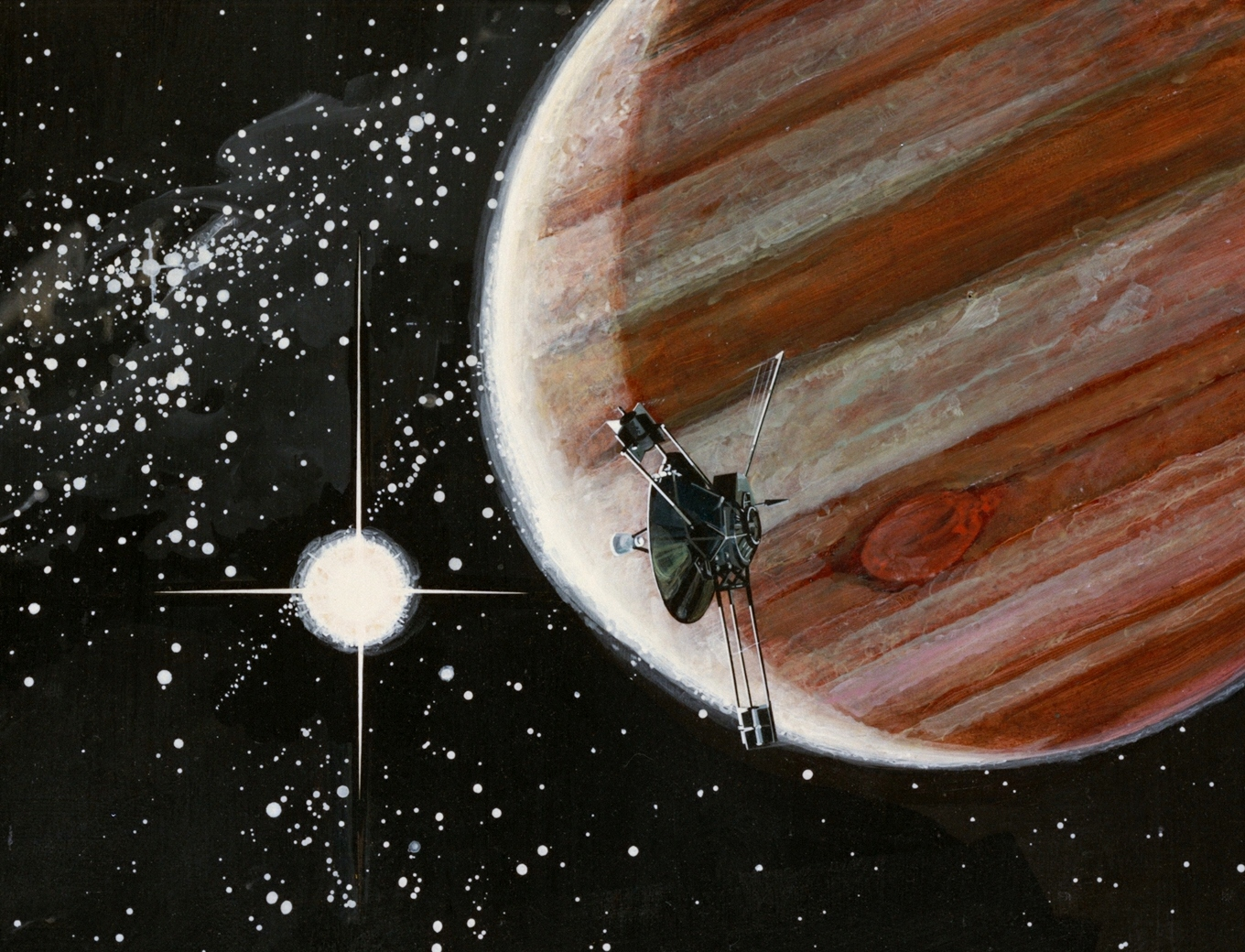
Pioneer 10 – first Jupiter flyby

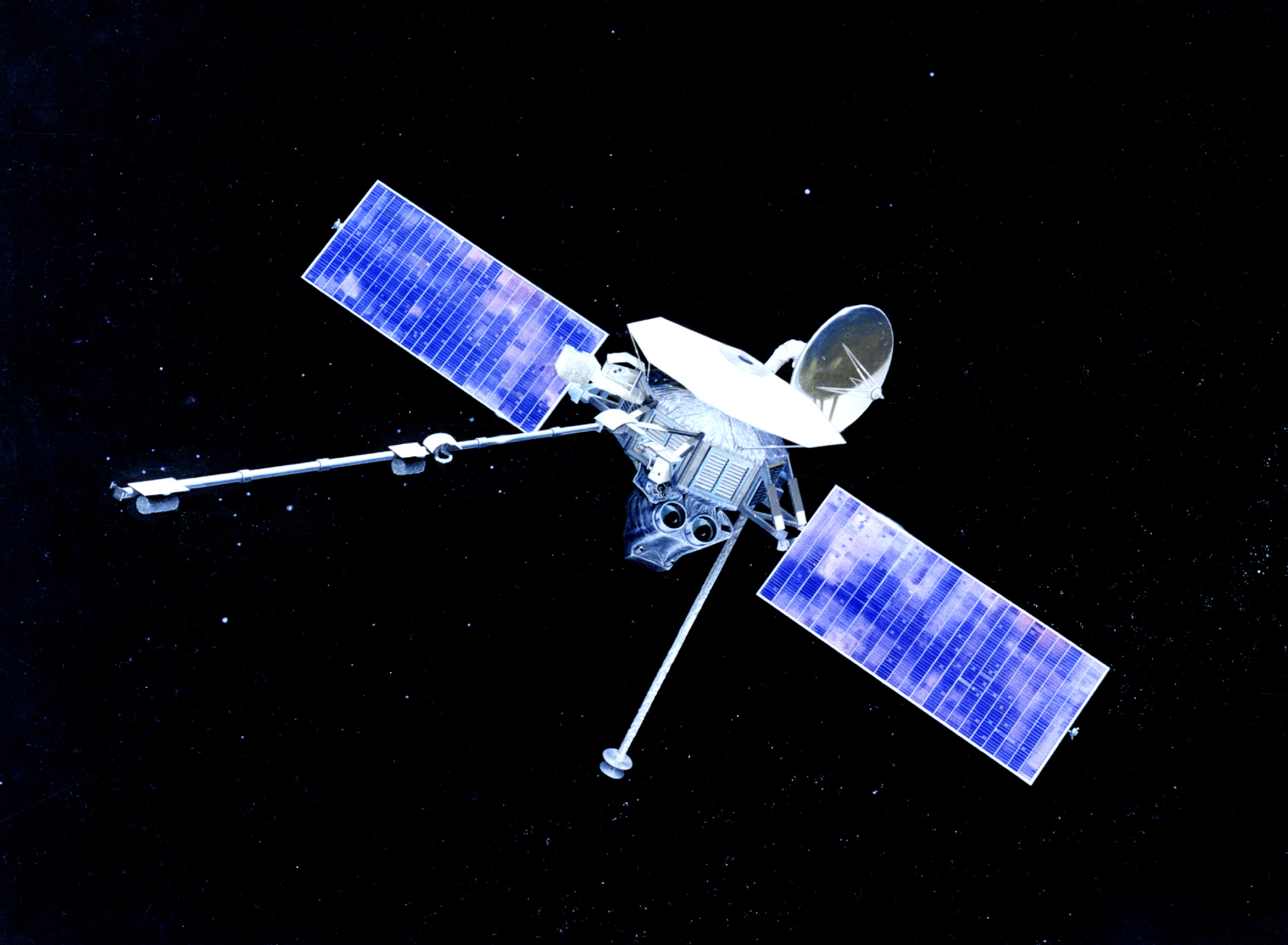
Mariner 10 – first Mercury flyby

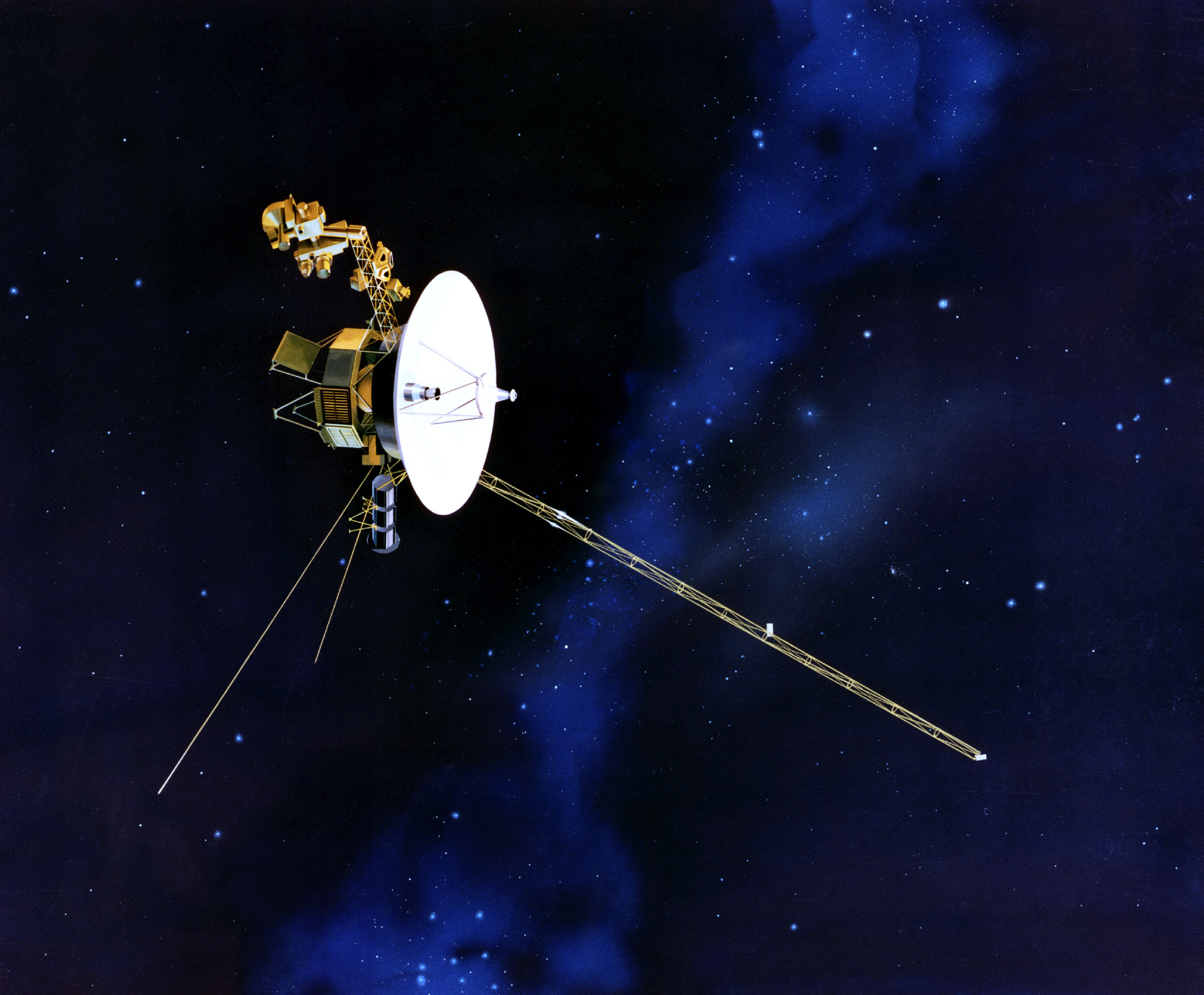
Voyager 2 – first Uranus and first Neptune flyby

Mission name	Launch date	Description	Ref(s)
(United States) Apollo 13	11 April 1970	Crewed lunar flyby and return to Earth (crewed lunar landing aborted). Farthest from Earth a human traveled until Artemis II in 2026 (400,171 km).	
(Soviet Union) Venera 7	17 August 1970	First Venus lander and the first spacecraft to "soft" land on another planet (with some data returned from the surface)	
(Soviet Union) Luna 16	12 September 1970	First robotic lunar sample return	
(Soviet Union) Zond 8	20 October 1970	Lunar flyby and return to Earth	
(Soviet Union) Luna 17/Lunokhod 1	10 November 1970	First remote controlled rover	
(United States) Apollo 14	31 January 1971	Crewed lunar landing	
(Soviet Union) Salyut 1	19 April 1971	First space station	
(Soviet Union) Mars 2	19 May 1971	First Mars impact, Mars orbiter and attempted lander; First rover (Prop-M) sent to another planet (Mars)	
(Soviet Union) Mars 3	28 May 1971	Mars orbiter (arrived after Mariner 9); First Mars lander (first image taken from the surface of another planet, though the received image did not show anything); First rover (Prop-M) to be landed but not deployed on another planet (Mars)	
(United States) Mariner 9	30 May 1971	First to orbit another planet (Mars)	
(United States) Apollo 15	26 July 1971	Crewed lunar landing; First crewed lunar rover	
(Soviet Union) Luna 18	2 September 1971	Attempted lunar sample return (crashed into Moon)	
(Soviet Union) Luna 19	28 September 1971	Lunar orbiter	
(Soviet Union) Luna 20	14 February 1972	Lunar robotic sample return	
(United States) Pioneer 10	3 March 1972	First Jupiter flyby	
(Soviet Union) Venera 8	27 March 1972	Venus lander	
(United States) Apollo 16	16 April 1972	Crewed lunar landing	
(United States) Apollo 17	7 December 1972	Last crewed lunar landing	
(Soviet Union) Luna 21/Lunokhod 2	8 January 1973	Lunar rover	
(United States) Pioneer 11	5 April 1973	Jupiter flyby and First Saturn flyby	
(United States) Explorer 49 (RAE-B)	10 June 1973	Lunar orbiter/radio astronomy	
(Soviet Union) Mars 4	21 July 1973	Mars flyby (attempted Mars orbiter)	
(Soviet Union) Mars 5	25 July 1973	Mars orbiter	
(Soviet Union) Mars 6	5 August 1973	Mars flyby and attempted lander (failed due to damage on Mars landing)	
(Soviet Union) Mars 7	9 August 1973	Mars flyby and attempted lander (missed Mars)	
(United States) Mariner 10	3 November 1973	Lunar and Venus flybys in addition to the First Mercury flyby	
(Soviet Union) Luna 22	29 May 1974	Lunar orbiter	
(Soviet Union) Luna 23	28 October 1974	Attempted lunar sample return (failed due to damage on lunar landing)	
(United States) (West Germany) Helios-A	10 December 1974	Solar observations	
(Soviet Union) Venera 9	8 June 1975	First Venus orbiter and lander; First successful images from the surface of another planet (Venus)	
(Soviet Union) Venera 10	14 June 1975	Venus orbiter and lander	
(United States) Viking 1	20 August 1975	Mars orbiter and lander; First clear pictures from Martian surface	
(United States) Viking 2	9 September 1975	Mars orbiter and lander	
(United States) (West Germany) Helios-B	15 January 1976	Solar observations	
(Soviet Union) Luna 24	9 August 1976	Lunar robotic sample return	
(United States) Voyager 2	20 August 1977	Jupiter/Saturn/first Uranus/first Neptune flyby	
(United States) Voyager 1	5 September 1977	Jupiter/Saturn flyby, first to exit the heliosphere	
(United States) Pioneer Venus 1	20 May 1978	Venus orbiter	
(United States) Pioneer Venus 2	8 August 1978	Venus atmospheric probes	
(United States) ISEE-3	12 August 1978	Solar wind investigations; later redesignated International Cometary Explorer and performed Comet Giacobini-Zinner and Comet Halley flybys – First comet flyby	
(Soviet Union) Venera 11	9 September 1978	Venus flyby and lander	
(Soviet Union) Venera 12	14 September 1978	Venus flyby and lander	

== 1980s ==
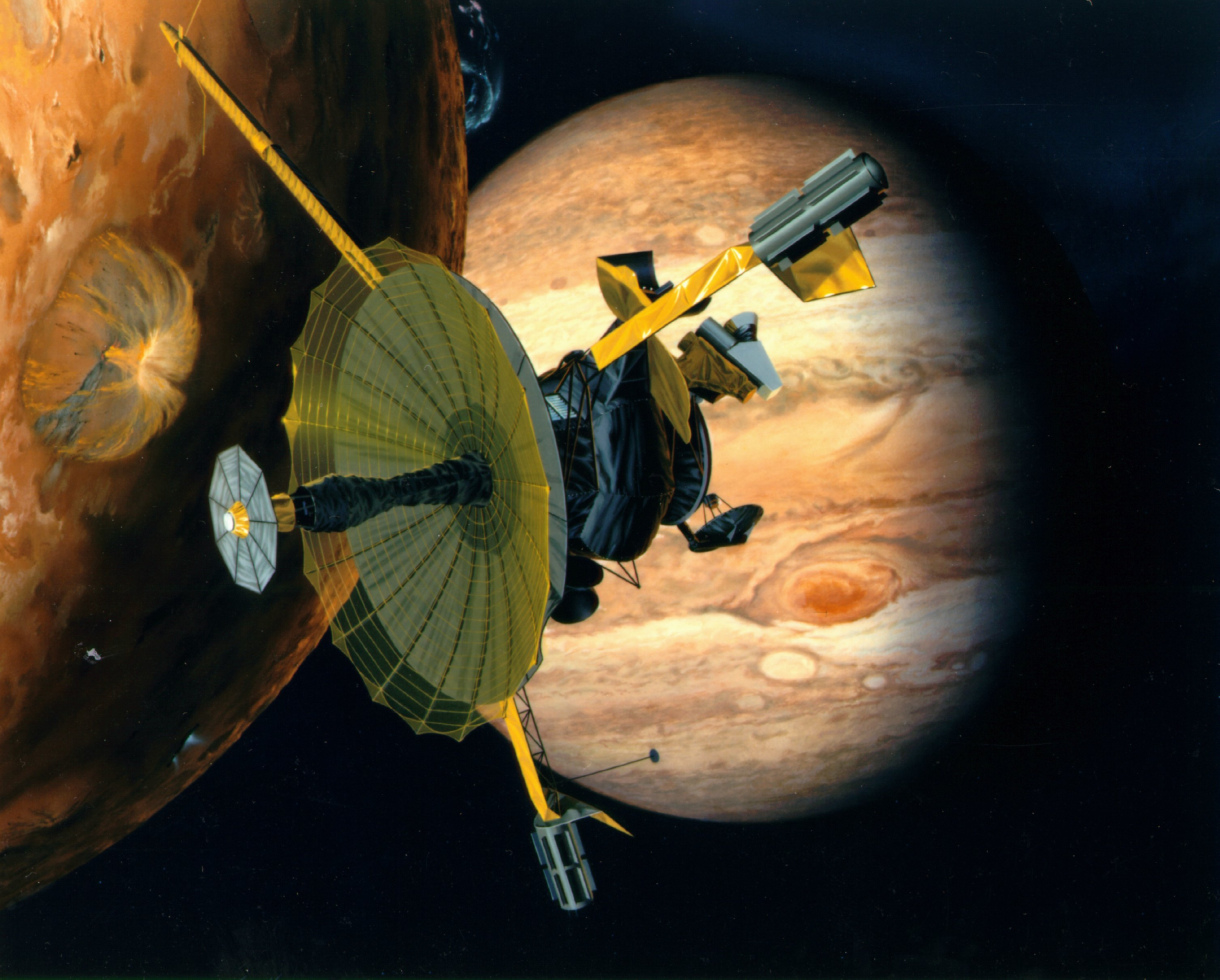
Galileo – mission to Jupiter

Mission name	Launch date	Description	Ref(s)
(Soviet Union) Venera 13	30 October 1981	Venus flyby and lander. First recording of sound on another planet.	
(Soviet Union) Venera 14	4 November 1981	Venus flyby and lander	
(Soviet Union) Venera 15	2 June 1983	Venus orbiter	
(Soviet Union) Venera 16	7 June 1983	Venus orbiter	
(Soviet Union) Vega 1	15 December 1984	Venus flyby, lander and first extraterrestrial aircraft (aerostat balloon); continued on to Comet Halley flyby	
(Soviet Union) Vega 2	21 December 1984	Venus flyby, lander and balloon; continued on to Comet Halley flyby	
(Japan) Sakigake	8 January 1985	Comet Halley flyby	
Giotto	2 July 1985	First close observation of comet (distance 596 kilometers), Comet Halley flyby	
(Japan) Suisei (Planet-A)	18 August 1985	Comet Halley flyby	
(Soviet Union) Mir	19 February 1986	First modular space station (operational 1986–2000; final module added 1996)	
(Soviet Union) Phobos 1	7 July 1988	Attempted Mars orbiter/Phobos landers (contact lost)	
(Soviet Union) Phobos 2	12 July 1988	Mars orbiter/attempted Phobos landers (contact lost)	
(United States) Magellan	4 May 1989	Venus orbiter	
(United States) Galileo	18 October 1989	Venus flyby, first Asteroid flyby (Gaspra), first Asteroid moon discovery (Dactyl), first Jupiter orbiter, first Jupiter atmospheric probe	

== 1990s ==
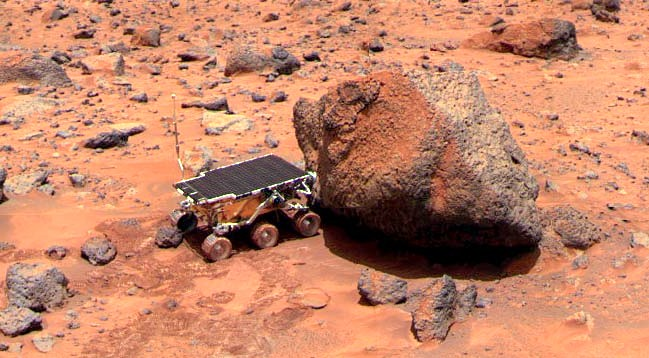
Mars Pathfinder – Mars lander and the first successful Mars rover, Sojourner

Cassini–Huygens – first Saturn orbiter and first Titan lander

Mission name	Launch date	Description	Ref(s)
(Japan) Hiten (MUSES-A)	24 January 1990	Lunar flyby and orbiter	
(United States) Hubble Space Telescope	24 April 1990	Orbital space telescope (operational since 1990)	
(United States) Ulysses	6 October 1990	Solar polar orbiter	
(Japan) (United States) Yohkoh (Solar-A)	30 August 1991	Solar observations (1991–2001)	
(United States) Mars Observer	25 September 1992	Attempted Mars orbiter (contact lost)	
(United States) Clementine	25 January 1994	Lunar orbiter/attempted asteroid flyby (contact lost)	
(United States) WIND	1 November 1994	Solar wind observations	
(United States) SOHO	2 December 1995	Solar observatory (operational since 1996)	
(United States) NEAR Shoemaker	17 February 1996	Eros orbiter, first near-Earth asteroid flyby, first asteroid orbit and first asteroid landing	
(United States) Mars Global Surveyor	7 November 1996	Mars orbiter	
(Russia) Mars 96	16 November 1996	Attempted Mars orbiter/landers (failed to escape Earth orbit)	
(United States) Mars Pathfinder	4 December 1996	Mars lander and first successful planetary rover	
(United States) ACE	25 August 1997	Solar wind and "space weather" observations (operational since 1998)	
(United States) (Italy) Cassini–Huygens	15 October 1997	First Saturn orbiter and first outer planet moon lander (on Titan)	
(United States) Lunar Prospector	7 January 1998	Lunar orbiter	
(Japan) Nozomi (Planet-B)	3 July 1998	Attempted Mars orbiter (failed to enter Mars orbit)	
(United States) Deep Space 1 (DS1)	24 October 1998	Asteroid and comet flyby	
(United States) (Russia) (Japan) (Canada) (Brazil) ISS	20 November 1998	International space station	
(United States) Mars Climate Orbiter	11 December 1998	Attempted Mars orbiter (orbit insertion failed; entered atmosphere and was destroyed)	
(United States) Mars Polar Lander/Deep Space 2 (DS2)	3 January 1999	Attempted Mars lander/penetrators (contact lost)	
(United States) Stardust	7 February 1999	First comet coma sample return (returned 15 January 2006)	

== 2000s ==
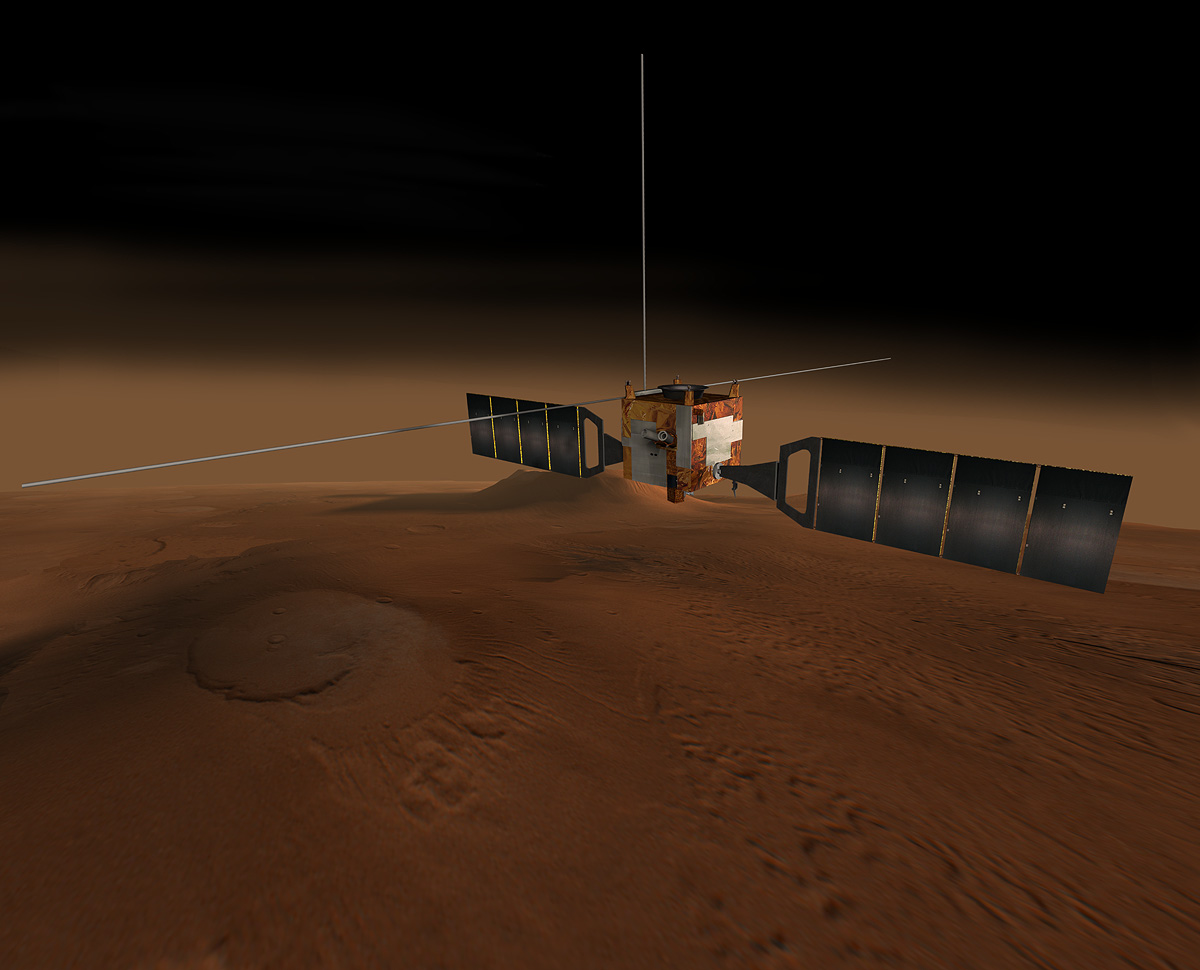
Mars Express/Beagle 2 – first planetary mission by the ESA

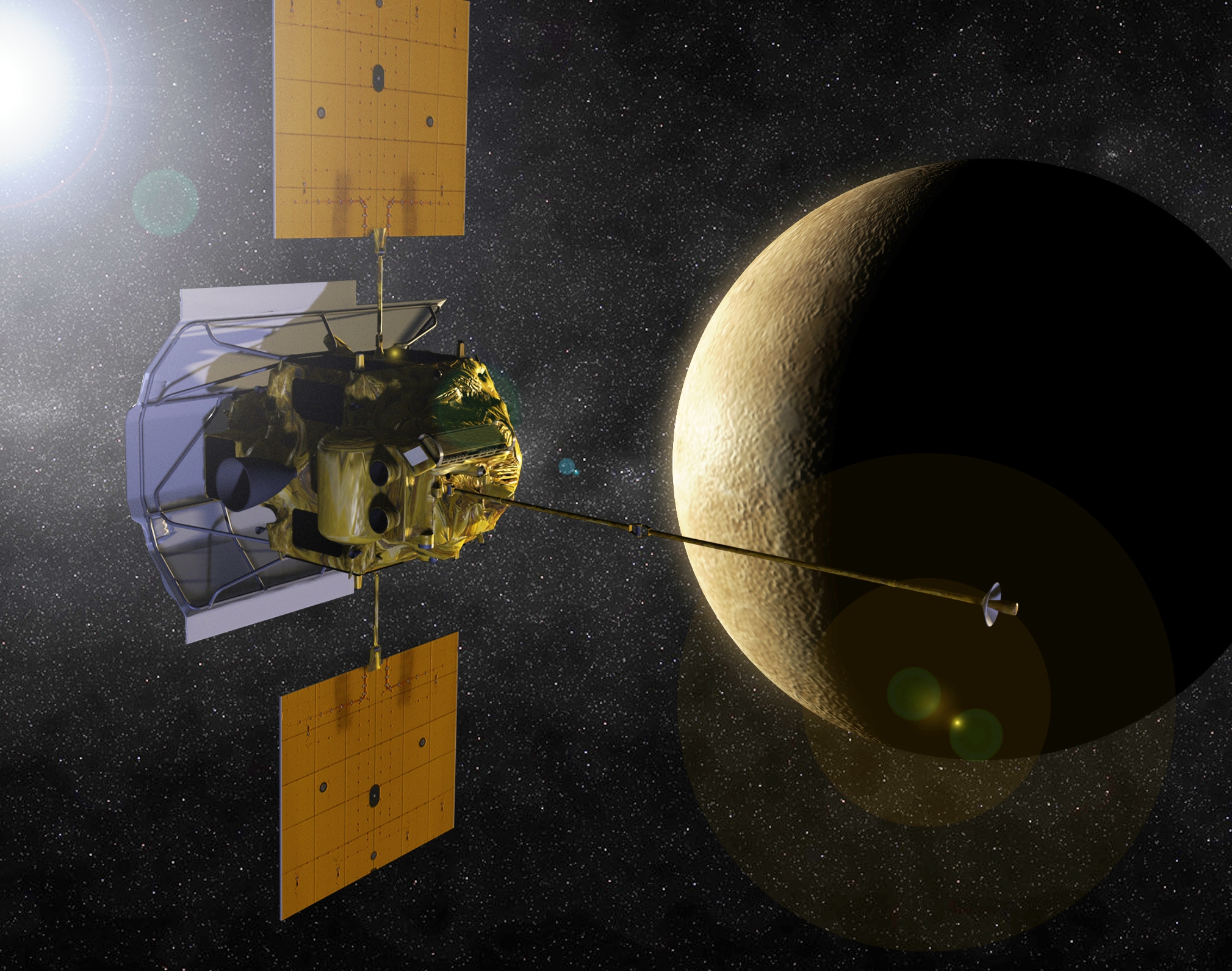
MESSENGER – first Mercury orbiter

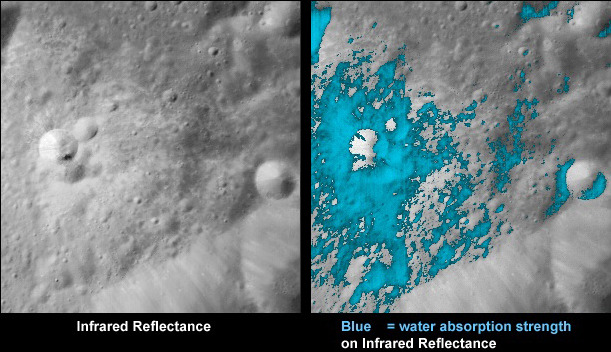
Chandrayaan-1 – water around fresh Moon crater

Mission name	Launch date	Description	Ref(s)
(United States) 2001 Mars Odyssey	7 April 2001	Mars orbiter	
(United States) Genesis	8 August 2001	First solar wind sample return	
(United States) CONTOUR	3 July 2002	Attempted flyby of comet nuclei (Encke, Schwassmann-Wachmann-3, and optionally a third one; lost in space)	
(Japan) Hayabusa (MUSES-C)	9 May 2003	Asteroid lander and first sample return from asteroid	
(United Kingdom) Mars Express/Beagle 2	2 June 2003	Mars orbiter/attempted lander (lander failure)	
(United States) Mars Exploration Rover Spirit	10 June 2003	Mars rover	
(United States) Mars Exploration Rover Opportunity	8 July 2003	Mars rover	
SMART-1	27 September 2003	Lunar orbiter	
Rosetta/Philae	2 March 2004	Asteroid Šteins and Lutetia flybys; first comet orbiter and lander (Landed in November 2014)	
(United States) MESSENGER	3 August 2004	First Mercury orbiter (Achieved orbit 18 March 2011)	
(United States) Deep Impact	12 January 2005	Comet flyby and impact	
(United States) Mars Reconnaissance Orbiter	12 August 2005	Mars orbiter	
Venus Express	9 November 2005	Venus polar orbiter	
(United States) New Horizons	19 January 2006	First Pluto/Charon flyby (on 14 July 2015); continued on to 486958 Arrokoth flyby (on 1 January 2019)	
(Japan) (United States) (United Kingdom) Hinode (Solar-B)	22 September 2006	Solar orbiter	
(United States) STEREO	26 October 2006	Two spacecraft, solar orbiters	
(United States) Phoenix	4 August 2007	Mars polar lander (Mars landing on 25 May 2008)	
(Japan) SELENE (Kaguya)	14 September 2007	Lunar orbiters	
(United States) Dawn	27 September 2007	Asteroid Ceres and Vesta orbiter (Entered orbit around Vesta on 16 July 2011 and around Ceres on 6 March 2015)	
(China) Chang'e 1	24 October 2007	Lunar orbiter	
(India) Chandrayaan-1	22 October 2008	Lunar orbiter and impactor; discovered water on the Moon	
Herschel Space Observatory	14 May 2009	Infrared space telescope at Sun–Earth L_{2} Lagrange point	
(United States) Lunar Reconnaissance Orbiter/LCROSS	18 June 2009	Lunar polar orbiter and lunar impactor	
(United States) WISE (NEOWISE)	14 December 2009	Infrared survey of celestial sky (WISE mission); later Near-Earth object survey (NEOWISE mission)	

== 2010s ==
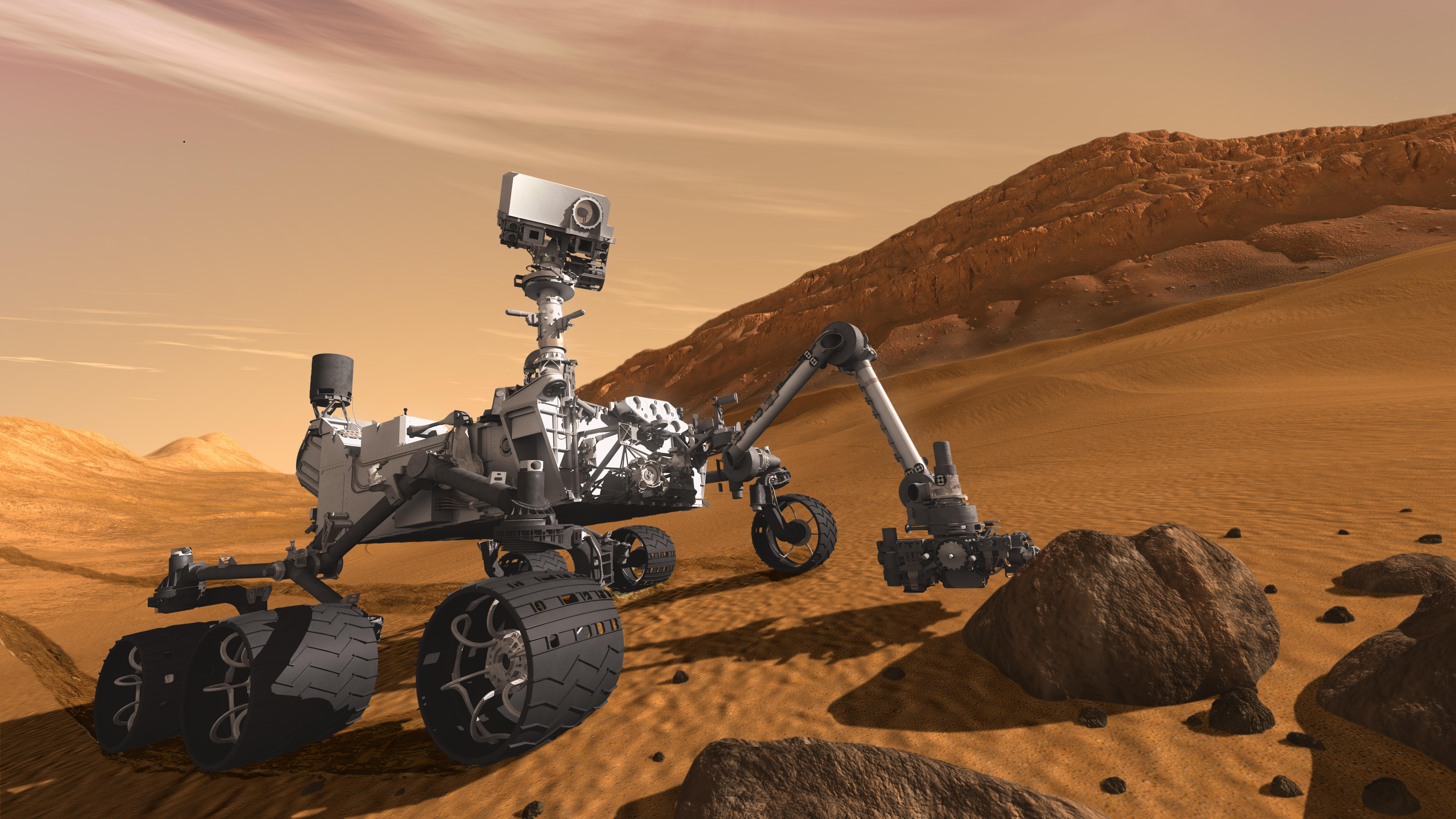
Mars Science Laboratory – Mars lander and large rover

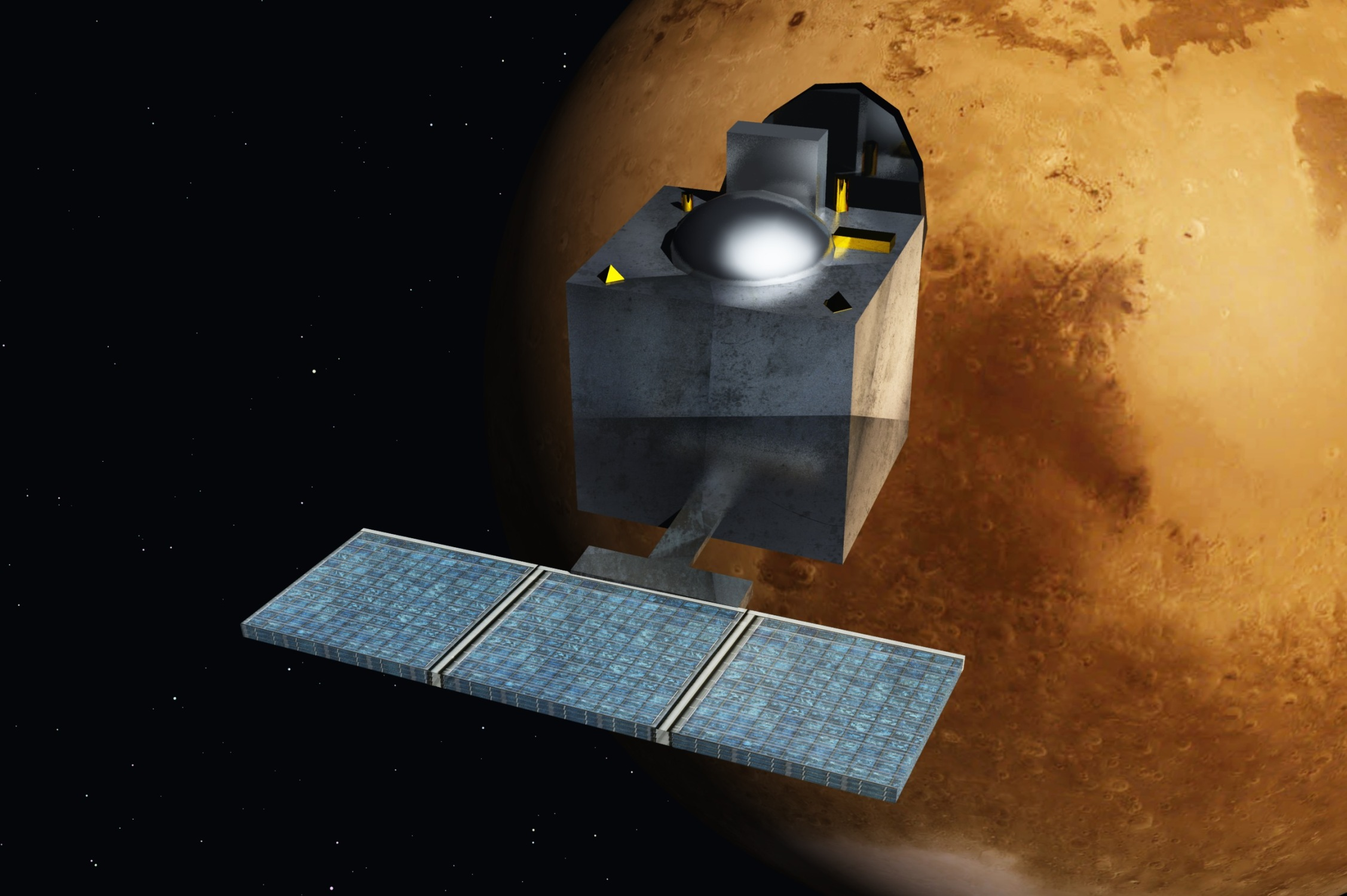
Mangalyaan – first Indian Mars orbiter

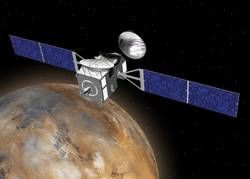
Trace Gas Orbiter – ESA/Roscosmos Mars orbiter

Mission name	Launch date	Description	Ref(s)
(United States) Solar Dynamics Observatory	11 February 2010	Continuous solar monitoring	
(Japan) Akatsuki (Planet-C)	20 May 2010	Venus orbiter (orbit insertion failed in 2010 / successful orbit insertion on 7 December 2015)	
(France) PICARD	15 June 2010	Solar monitoring	
(China) Chang'e 2	1 October 2010	Lunar orbiter, asteroid 4179 Toutatis flyby	
(United States) Juno	5 August 2011	Jupiter orbiter	
(United States) GRAIL	10 September 2011	Two spacecraft, Lunar orbiters	
(Russia) (China) Fobos-Grunt and Yinghuo-1	8 November 2011	Attempted Phobos sample return and Mars orbiter, respectively; both failed to escape Earth orbit	
(United States) Mars Science Laboratory (Curiosity rover)	26 November 2011	Mars rover (landed 6 August 2012)	
(United States) Van Allen Probes (RBSP)	30 August 2012	Earth Van Allen radiation belts study	
(United States) IRIS	28 June 2013	Solar observations	
(United States) LADEE	7 September 2013	Lunar orbiter	
(Japan) Hisaki	14 September 2013	Planetary atmosphere observatory	
(India) Mars Orbiter Mission (Mangalyaan)	5 November 2013	Mars orbiter	
(United States) MAVEN	18 November 2013	Mars orbiter	
(China) Chang'e 3	1 December 2013	Lunar lander and rover (first lander since Soviet Luna 24 in 1976)	
(China) Chang'e 5-T1	23 October 2014	Circumlunar mission and Earth reentry; technology demonstration to prepare for Chang'e 5 mission	
(Japan) (Germany) (France) Hayabusa2 / MASCOT	3 December 2014	Asteroid lander and sample return (sample returned 5 December 2020), first asteroid rover	
(Japan) PROCYON	3 December 2014	Comet observer and attempted asteroid flyby (engine failure)	
(United States) DSCOVR	11 February 2015	Solar observation	
(Russia) ExoMars Trace Gas Orbiter and EDM lander	14 March 2016	Mars orbiter and attempted lander (lander failure)	
(United States) OSIRIS-REx	8 September 2016	Asteroid sample return mission (sample returned 24 September 2023)	
(United States) InSight	5 May 2018	Mars lander	
(China) Queqiao	20 May 2018	Relay satellite for Chang'e 4 in Halo orbit around Earth–Moon L_{2} Lagrange point	
(United States) Parker Solar Probe	12 August 2018	Solar corona probe, closest solar approach (0.04 AU)	
(Japan) BepiColombo	19 October 2018	Two Mercury orbiters (orbit insertion planned in November 2026)	
(China) Chang'e 4	7 December 2018	Lunar lander and rover, first landing on the lunar far side	
(Israel) Beresheet	22 February 2019	Attempted lunar lander (crashed into Moon)	
(India) Chandrayaan-2	22 July 2019	Lunar orbiter; attempted lander and rover (contact lost during final stage of descent)	

== 2020s ==
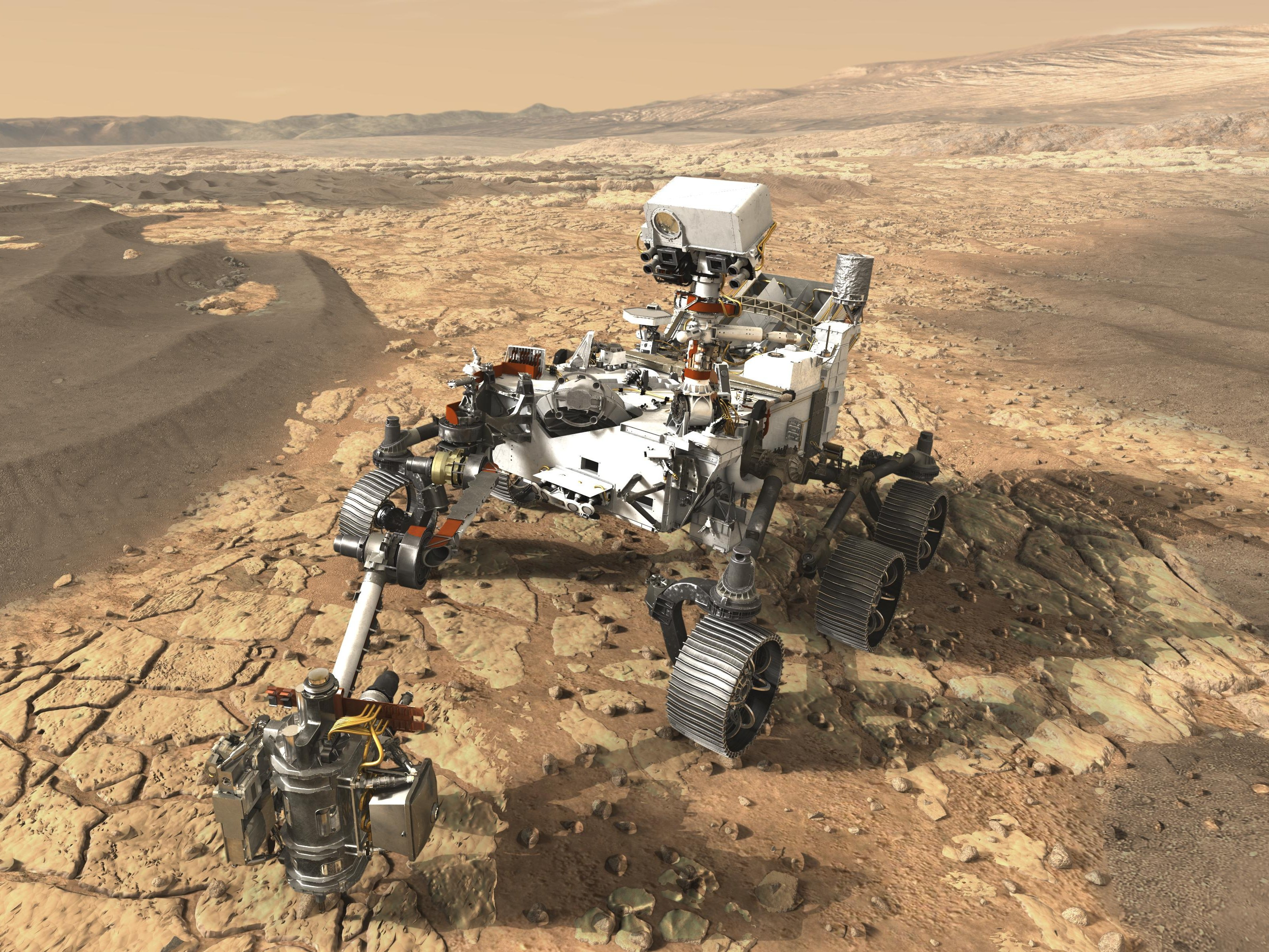
NASA's Perseverance rover

Mission name	Launch date	Description	Ref(s)
Solar Orbiter	10 February 2020	Sun-observing satellite	
(United Arab Emirates) Mars Hope	19 July 2020	Mars orbiter	
(China) Tianwen-1 (Zhurong rover)	23 July 2020	Mars orbiter, lander, and rover	
(United States) Mars 2020 (Perseverance rover and Ingenuity helicopter)	30 July 2020	Mars rover and helicopter drone; first powered flight on another planet	
(China) Chang'e 5	23 November 2020	Lunar sample return	
(United States) Lucy	16 October 2021	Flyby of six Jupiter trojans and two main belt asteroids	
(United States) (Italy) DART / LICIACube	24 November 2021	Asteroid 65803 Didymos flyby, asteroid moon Dimorphos impactor	
(United States) (Canada) James Webb Space Telescope	25 December 2021	Infrared space telescope at Sun–Earth L_{2}	
(United States) CAPSTONE	28 June 2022	Lunar orbiter	
(South Korea) (United States) Danuri (KPLO)	5 August 2022	Lunar orbiter	
(United States) Artemis 1 and 10 cubesats	16 November 2022	Uncrewed lunar orbital test of Orion spacecraft and Space Launch System. The cubesats are launched as rideshares and will execute their own missions.	
(Japan) (United States) Hakuto-R Mission 1 (Rashid rover) and Lunar Flashlight	11 December 2022	Lunar lander technology demonstration, lunar rover, and lunar orbiter launched together (crashed into Moon)	
JUICE	14 April 2023	Jupiter/Ganymede orbiter	
Euclid	1 July 2023	Infrared space telescope at Sun–Earth L_{2}	
(India) Chandrayaan-3	14 July 2023	Lunar orbiter, lander and rover; first soft landing near the lunar South Pole	
(Russia) Luna 25	10 August 2023	Attempted lunar south pole lander (crashed into Moon)	
(India) Aditya-L1	2 September 2023	Sun-observing spacecraft at Sun–Earth L_{1}	
(Japan) SLIM (LEV-1, LEV-2)	6 September 2023	Lunar flyby, lander and rovers	
(United States) Psyche	13 October 2023	Asteroid 16 Psyche orbiter	
(United States) Peregrine Mission One (including Iris and Colmena rovers)	8 January 2024	Lunar lander and rovers (landing precluded)	
(United States) IM-1 Nova-C Odysseus (including EagleCam deployable camera)	15 February 2024	Lunar landers	
(China) DRO A/B	13 March 2024	Lunar orbiters	
(China) Queqiao-2 (including Tiandu-1 and 2)	20 March 2024	Lunar orbiters	
(China) Chang'e 6 (including Pakistan's ICUBE-Q cubesat)	3 May 2024	Lunar sample return, rover and orbiters; first sample return from the lunar far side	
Hera (3 orbiters)	7 October 2024	Asteroid 65803 Didymos rendezvous	
(United States) Europa Clipper	14 October 2024	Jupiter orbiter, Currently in transit.	
(United States) Blue Ghost M1	15 January 2025	Lunar lander, first private company to soft land on the Moon	
(Japan) Hakuto-R Mission 2 (including Tenacious rover)	15 January 2025	Lunar lander and rover	
(United States) Intuitive Machines Nova-C IM-2 (including MAPP LV1, Micro-Nova, AstroAnt and Yaoki rover)	27 February 2025	Lunar lander and rovers	
(United States) Lunar Trailblazer	27 February 2025	Lunar orbiter	
(United States) Brokkr-2	27 February 2025	Asteroid flyby	
(United States) Chimera GEO-1	27 February 2025	Lunar flyby	
(China) Tianwen-2 (orbiters and landers)	29 May 2025	Asteroid study and sample return	
(United States) Carruthers Geocorona Observatory	24 September 2025	heliophysics mission	
(United States) Space Weather Follow On-Lagrange 1	24 September 2025	heliophysics mission	
(United States) Interstellar Mapping and Acceleration Probe	24 September 2025	heliophysics mission	
(United States) EscaPADE	13 November 2025	Two orbiters to Mars	
(United States) Artemis II	1 April 2026	Crewed lunar flyby; Farthest from Earth humans have ever gone (406,771 km)	
(China) SMILE	19 May 2026	Solar storm research	
(United States) Nancy Grace Roman Space Telescope	30 August 2026	Space observatory stationed at the Sun-Earth L_{2} Lagrange point to study dark energy, dark matter, and search for exoplanets.	
(Japan) Martian Moons eXploration	19 October 2026	Phobos rover and sample return	

== See also ==
- Discovery and exploration of the Solar System
- Human presence in space
- List of missions to the Moon
- List of missions to Venus
- List of missions to Mars
- List of Solar System probes
- List of interplanetary voyages
- List of space telescopes
- New Frontiers program
- Out of the Cradle – 1984 book about scientific speculation on future missions.
- Space Race
- Timeline of artificial satellites and space probes
- Timeline of discovery of Solar System planets and their moons
- Timeline of first orbital launches by country
- Timeline of space exploration
- Timeline of space travel by nationality
- Timeline of spaceflight
