= Luna programme =

Robotic spacecraft missions to the Moon by the Soviet Union (1958–1976)

Luna space programme
- Космическая Программа "Луна"; Kosmicheskaya Programma "Luna"
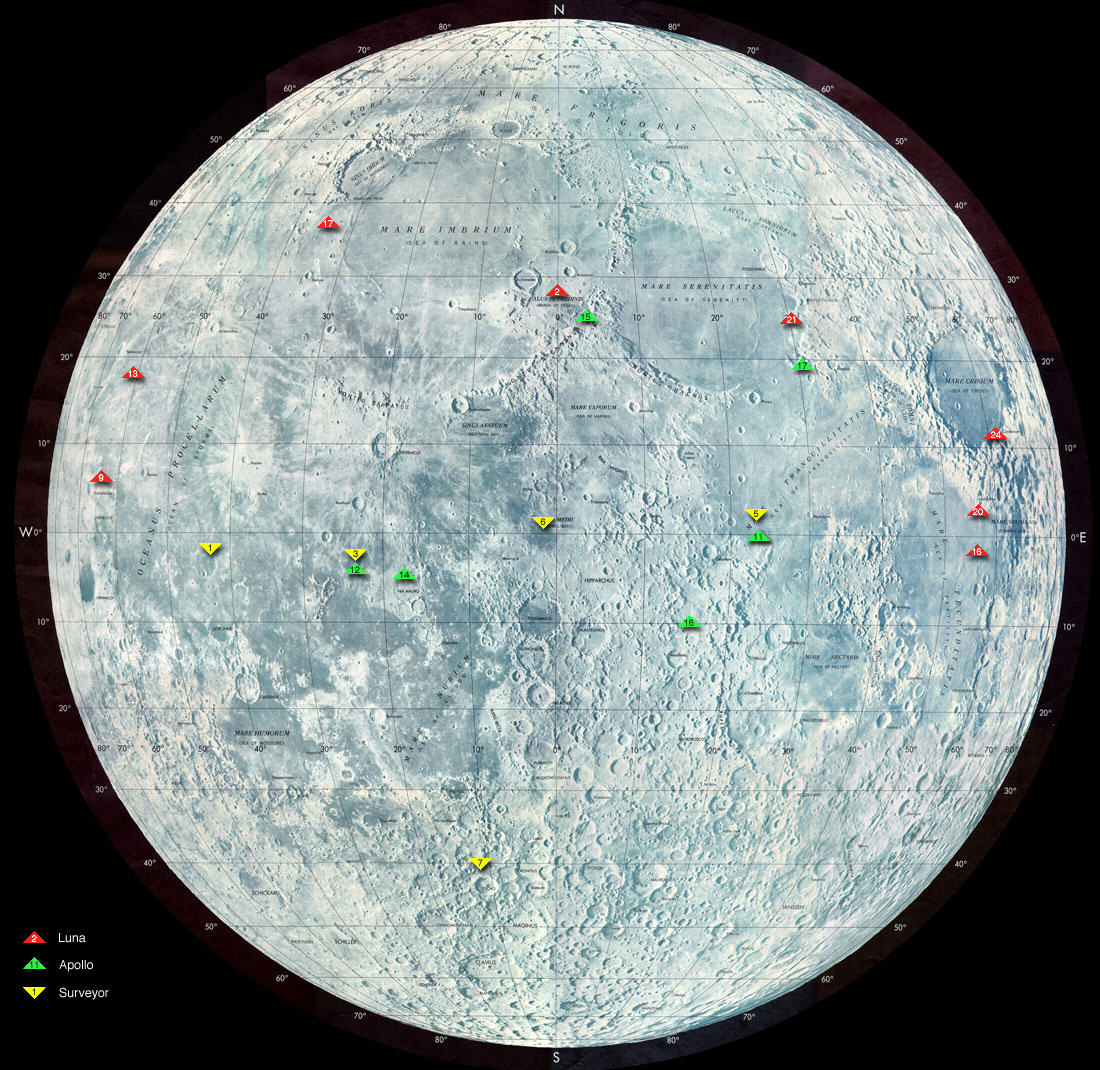
- Locations of Luna landings on the Moon are marked in red; Apollo missions in green, and Surveyor in yellow.

Program overview
- Country: Soviet Union
- Purpose: Uncrewed exploration of the Moon
- Status: Operational

Programme history
- Duration: 1958–1976
- First flight: Luna E-1 No.1; 23 September 1958
- Last flight: Luna 24; 9 August 1976
- Successes: 15
- Failures: 28
- Partial failures: 1
- Launch site: Baikonur Cosmodrome

Vehicle information
- Launch vehicles: Luna 8K72; Molniya-L; Molniya-M; Proton-K/D-1; Soyuz 2.1b

The Luna programme (from the Russian word Луна "Luna" meaning "Moon"), sometimes called Lunik by western media, was a series of robotic spacecraft missions sent to the Moon by the Soviet Union between 1959 and 1976. The programme accomplished many firsts in space exploration, including first flyby of the Moon, first impact of the Moon and first photos of the far side of the Moon. Each mission was designed as either an orbiter or lander. They also performed many experiments, studying the Moon's chemical composition, gravity, temperature, and radiation.

Twenty-four spacecraft were formally given the Luna designation, although more were launched. Those that failed to reach orbit were not publicly acknowledged at the time, and not assigned a Luna number. Those that failed in low Earth orbit were usually given Cosmos designations. The estimated cost of the Luna programme in 1964 was US$6–10 billion (equivalent to US$48–79 billion in 2025). The Luna 25 mission also continues the Luna designation, although it is considered to be a part of the Luna-Glob exploration programme. The same applies to other planned missions such as Luna 26, Luna 27 and Luna 28.

== Mission types ==
The name Luna was used to designate a variety of spacecraft designs, to achieve several types of missions: flyby, lunar orbiter, soft lander, and sample return spacecraft. Notable achievements include the first Moon flyby (Luna 1), the first impact (Luna 2), the first photos of the far side (Luna 3), the first soft landing (Luna 9), and the first robotic sample return (Luna 16).

=== Impactors ===
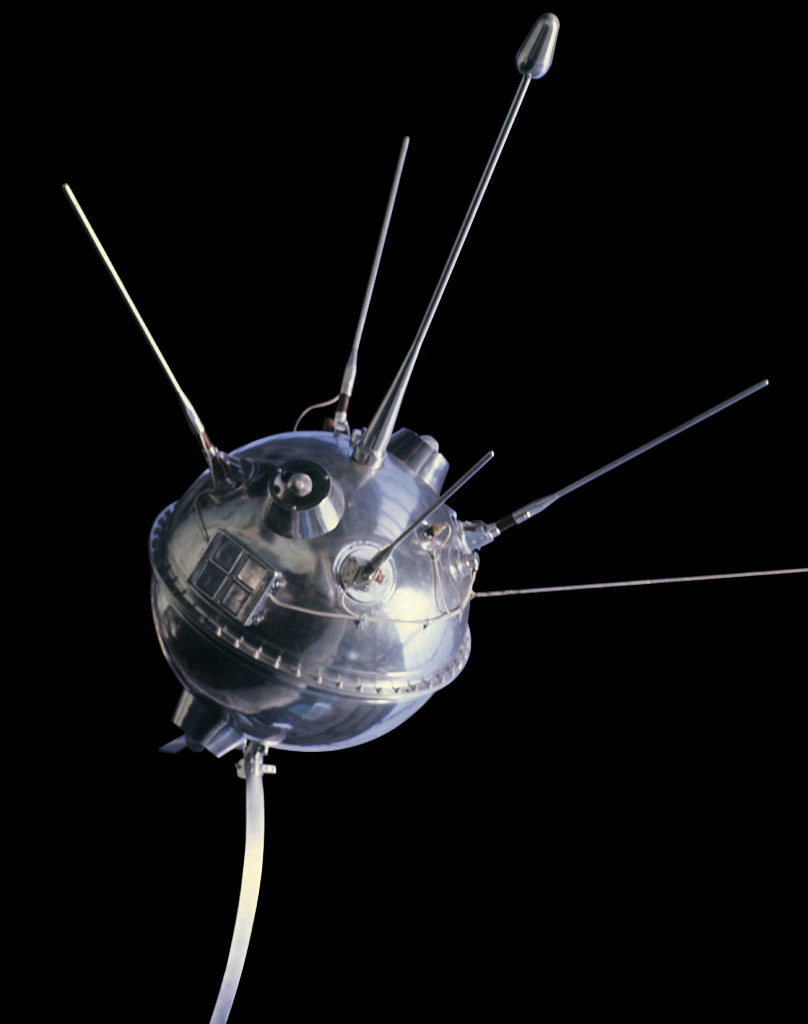
Luna 1 impactor

Impactor spacecraft had the generic designation of Ye-1 (or E-1 depending on transliteration from Russian) and were designed to hit the near side of the Moon. Luna 1 (January 1959) missed its intended impact with the Moon and became the first spacecraft to escape the Earth-Moon system. Luna 2 (September 1959) mission successfully hit the Moon's surface, becoming the first man-made object to reach the Moon. This was Luna's only impact success out of six tries from September 1958 to September 1959.

=== Flybys ===
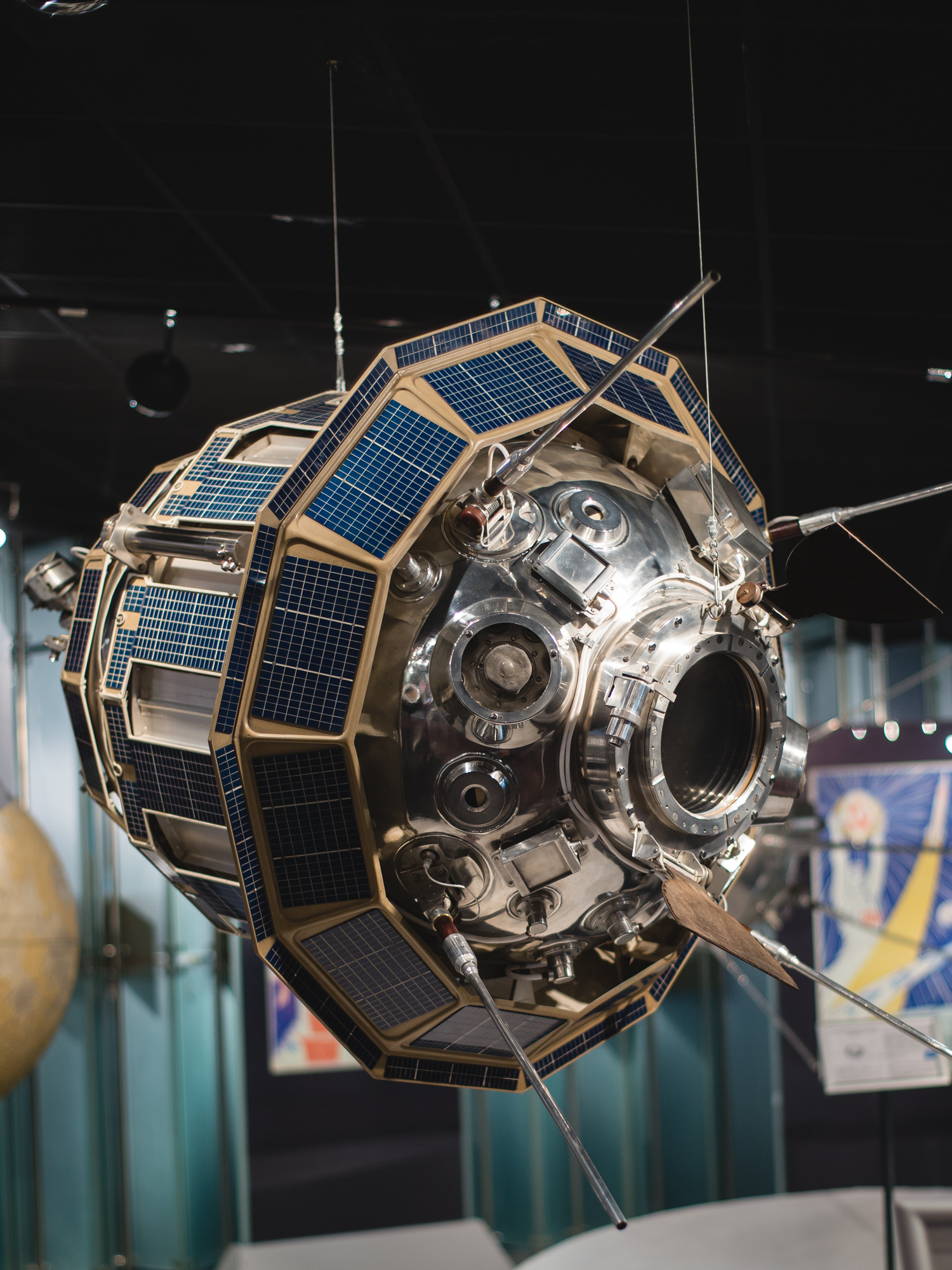
Luna 3 flyby spacecraft model

A flyby is the simplest lunar spacecraft, requiring neither a propulsion device for slowing, nor a guidance system sensitive enough to hit the Moon. Flyby spacecraft had the generic designations of Ye-2 and Ye-3 (E-2 and E-3 depending on transliteration from Russian). Their function was to transmit photographs back to Earth. Luna 3 (October 1959) rounded the Moon later that year, and returned the first photographs of its far side, which can never be seen from Earth. This was Luna's only successful flyby, out of three tries from October 1959 to April 1960.

=== Soft landers ===
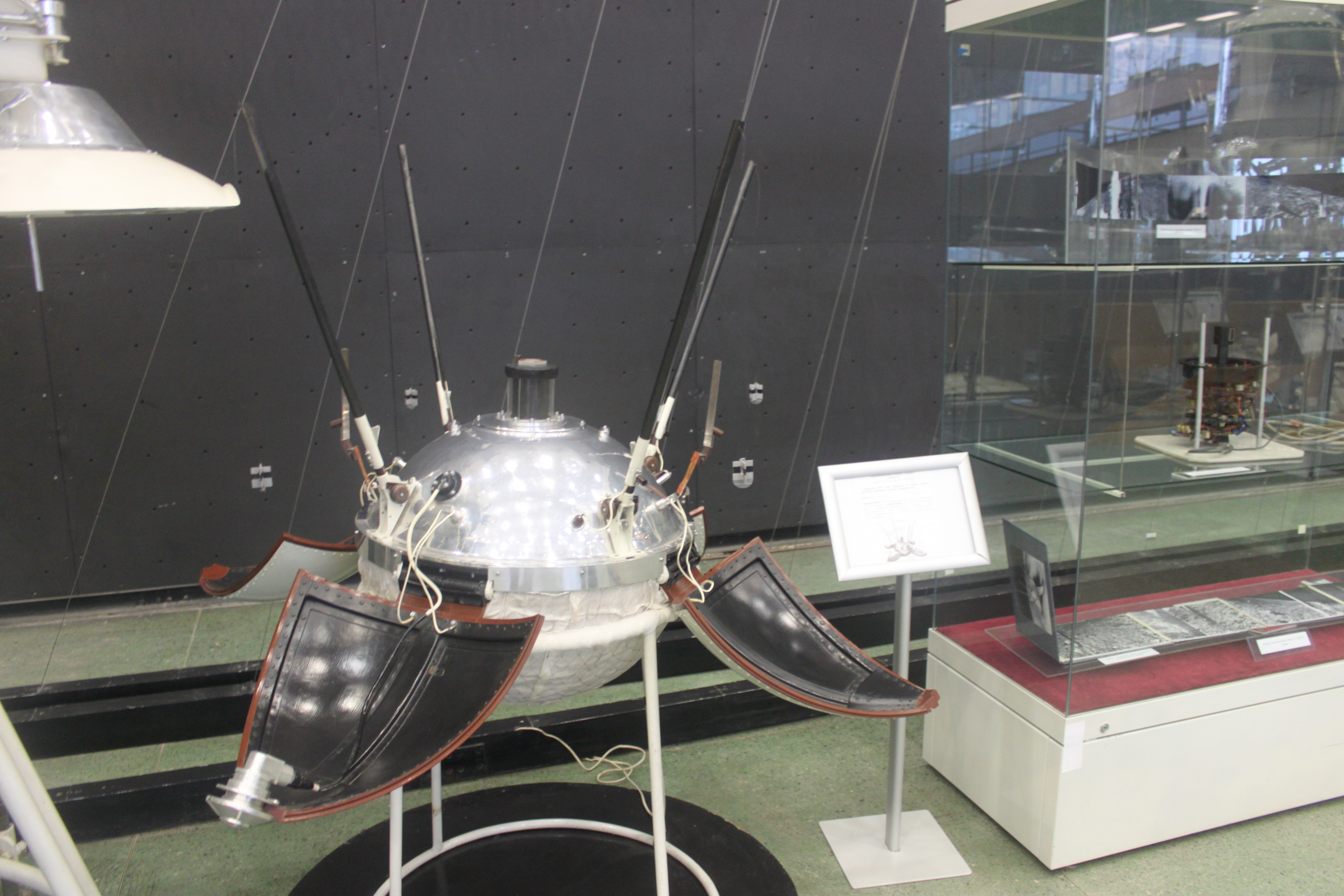
Luna 9 lander model

Soft landers require rocket propulsion to slow their speed sufficiently to prevent the craft's destruction. They can continue to transmit pictures from the surface, and possibly dig into the lunar soil or return other information about the lunar environment.

Luna program landers had the generic designations of Ye-6 or Ye-6M (E-6 or E-6M depending on transliteration from Russian). Two successful soft landings were achieved out of thirteen attempts from January 1963 to December 1966.

Luna 9 (E-6 No.13) became the first probe to achieve a soft landing on another planetary body in February 1966. It transmitted five black and white stereoscopic circular panoramas, which were the first close-up shots of the lunar surface.

=== Orbiters ===
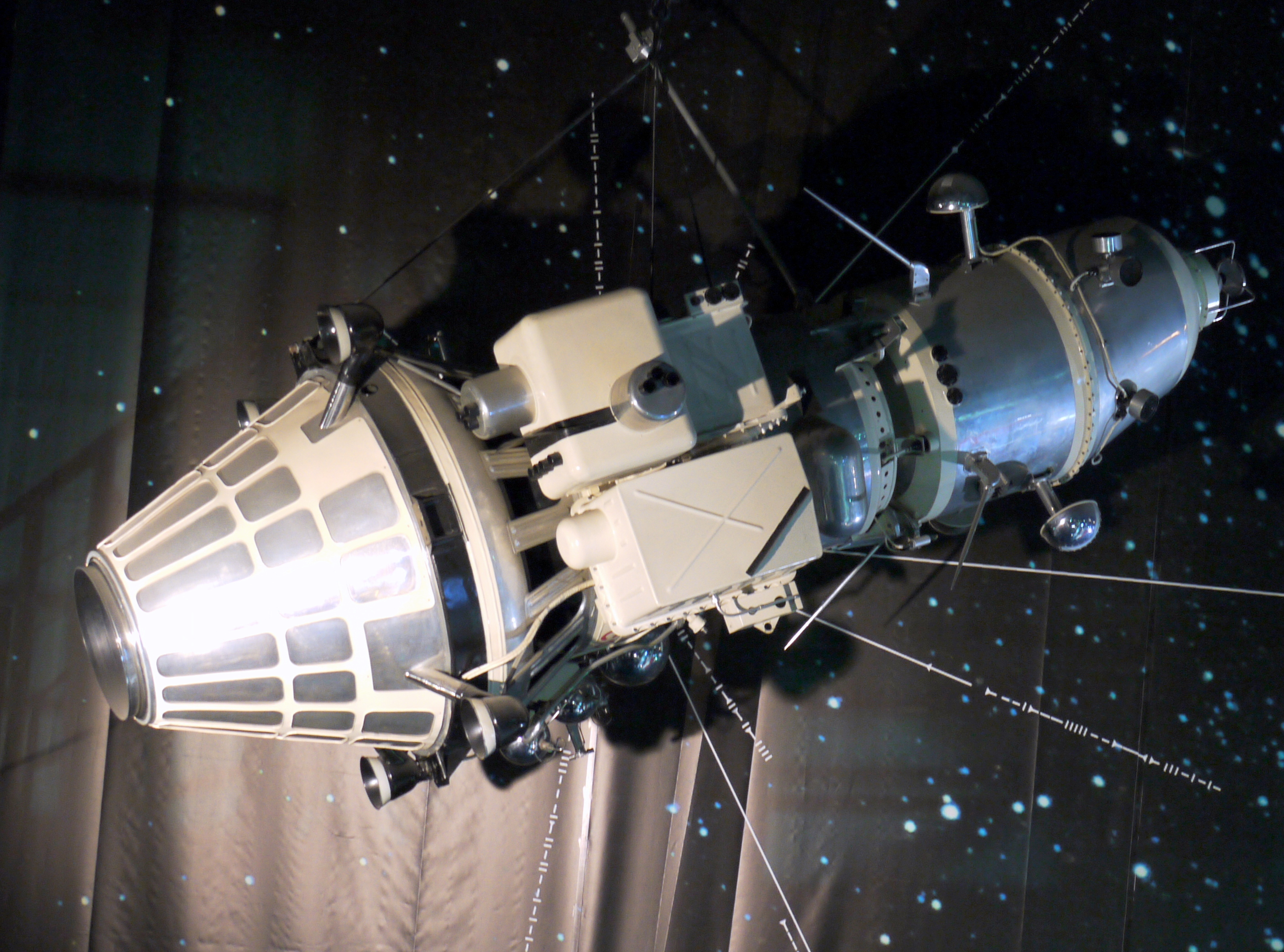
Luna 10 orbiter model

Orbiter spacecraft require less thrust and propellant than landers, but still require enough to achieve lunar orbit insertion. Luna 10 (March 1966) became the first artificial satellite of the Moon. Luna program orbiters had the generic designations of Ye-6LF, Ye-6LS, Ye-6S or Ye-8LS (E-6, E-6LS, E-6S or E-8LS depending on transliteration from Russian). Luna flew six successful orbiters out of eight attempts from March 1966 to May 1974.

=== Rovers ===
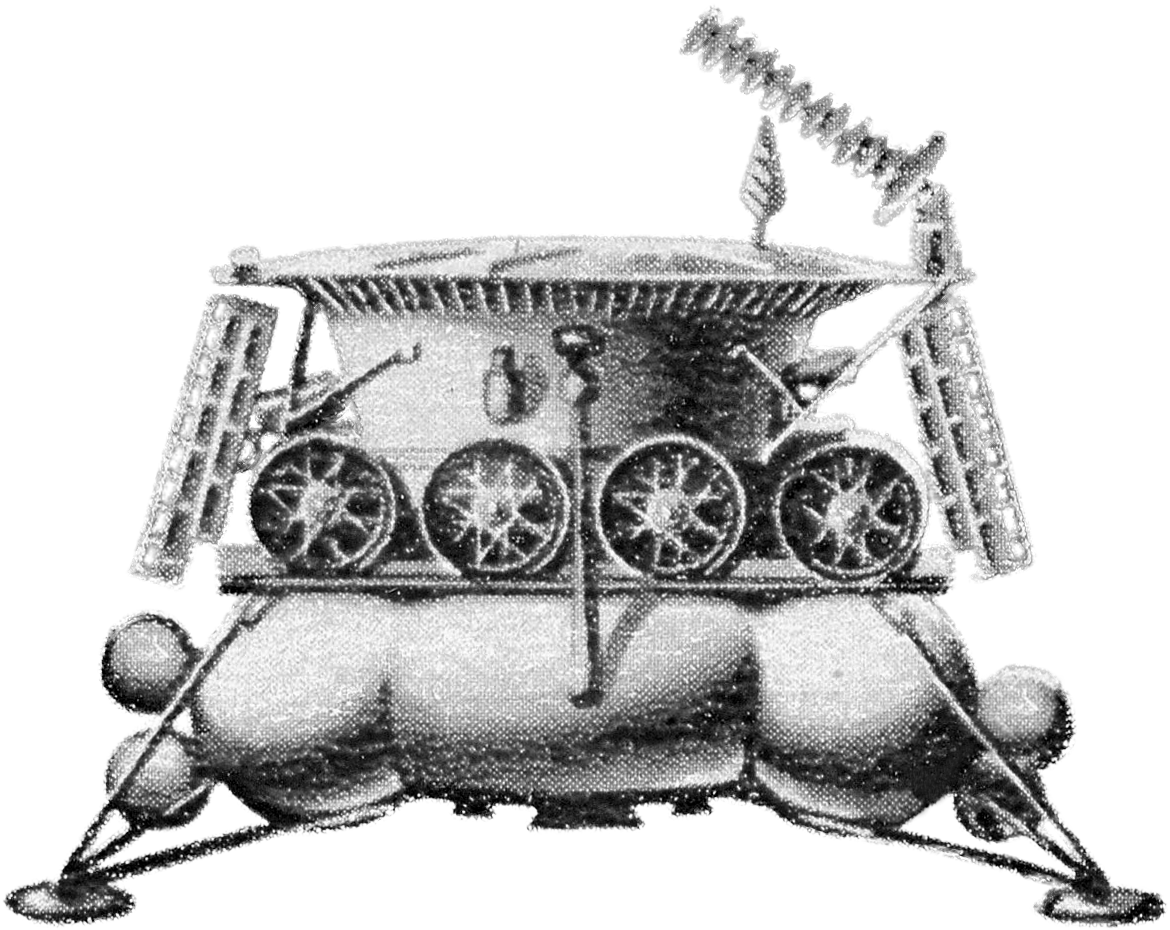
Luna 17 lander with Lunokhod 1 rover payload

More sophisticated soft lander craft can deploy wheeled vehicles to explore a wider area of the lunar surface than the immediate landing site. Luna program landers with rovers had the generic designations of Ye-8 (E-8 depending on transliteration from Russian).

The first attempted Lunokhod failed in February 1969. Luna 17 (November 1970) and Luna 21 (January 1973) carried Lunokhod vehicles, which were the first robotic wheeled vehicles to explore the Moon's terrain. Lunokhod 1 travelled 10.5 kilometres (6.5 mi) in 322 days and returned more than 20,000 television images and 206 high-resolution panoramas. Lunokhod 2 operated for about four months, and covered 42 kilometres (26 mi) of terrain, A third Lunokhod was built and intended for launch in 1977, but never flew due to lack of launchers and funding.

=== Sample return ===
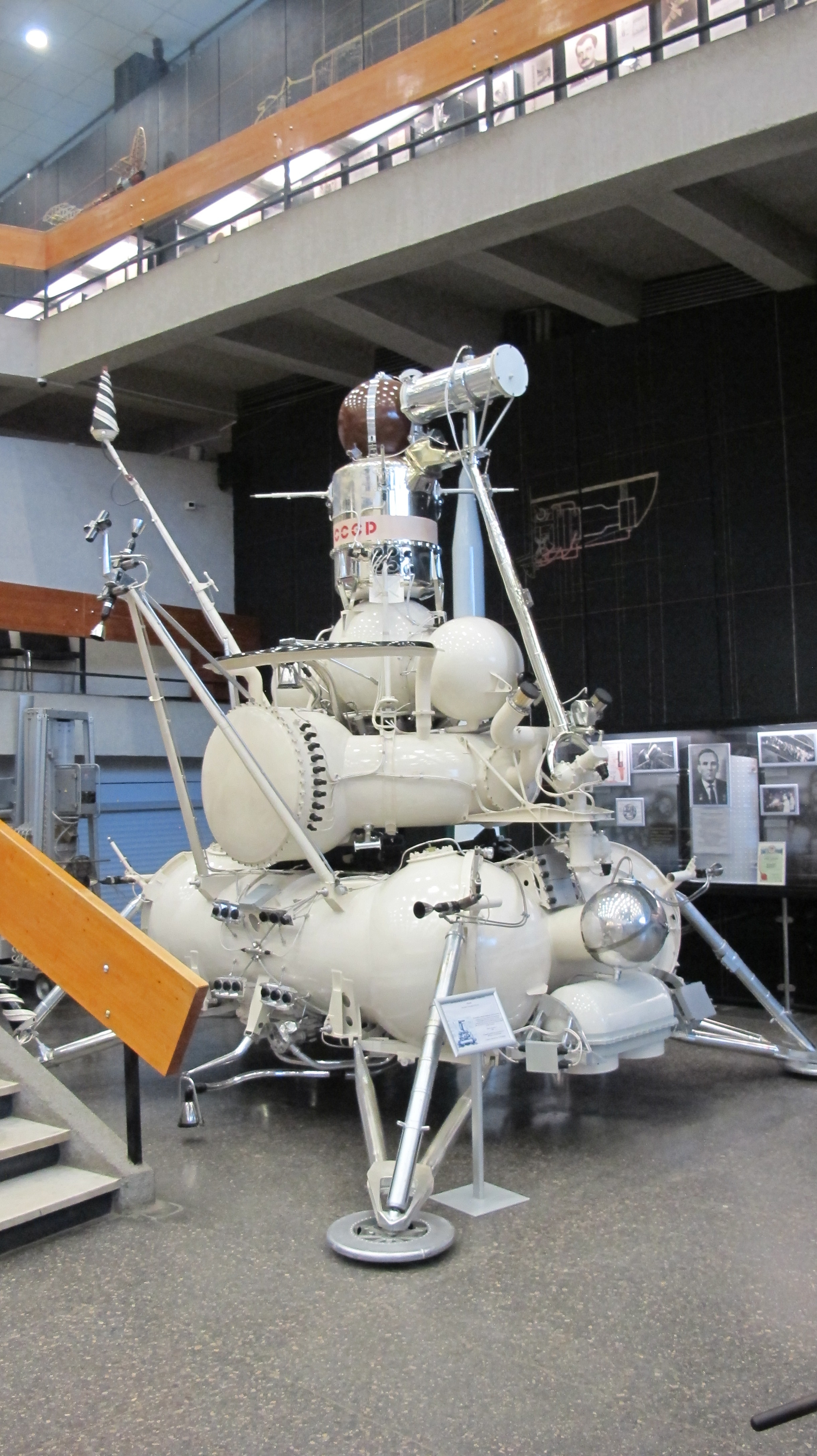
Luna 16 sample return lander model

More complex soft lander craft can robotically scoop up a small amount of lunar material, lift off from the surface, and return the material to Earth. Luna program sample return landers had the generic designations of Ye-8-5 or Ye-8-5M (E-8-5 or E-8-5M depending on transliteration from Russian).

Luna 16 (September 1970), Luna 20 (February 1972) and Luna 24 (August 1976), returned samples of lunar soil to Earth. A total of 301 g (10.6 oz) of soil sample was returned from the three missions.

Luna 15 (July 1969) flew at the same time as the Apollo 11 mission. Neil Armstrong and Buzz Aldrin had already performed the first crewed lunar landing when Luna 15 began its descent, and the spacecraft crashed into a mountain minutes later.

== Mission success rates ==
While the program was active, it was Soviet practice not to release any details of missions that had failed to achieve orbit. This resulted in Western observers assigning their own designations to the missions. For example, Luna E-1 No.1, the first failure of 1958 which NASA believed was associated with the Luna programme, was known as Luna 1958A.

	Luna					Competing United States programmes				
Type	First attempt	Attempts	First success	Successes	Rate	First attempt	Attempts	First success	Successes	Rate
Impactor	23 Sep 1958	6	Luna 2 Sep 13, 1959	1	16.7%	Ranger 1; 23 Aug 1961	9	Ranger 7; 31 July 1964	3	33.3%
Flyby	Luna 3; 6 Oct 1959	3	Luna 3	1	33.3%	Pioneer 3; 6 Dec 1958	2	Pioneer 4; 6 Mar 1959	1	50.0%
Soft lander	4 Jan 1963	13	Luna 9; 3 Feb 1966	2	15.4%	Surveyor 1; 2 Jun 1966	7	Surveyor 1	5	71.4%
Orbiter	1 Mar 1966	8	Luna 10; 3 Apr 1966	6	75.0%	Pioneer 0; 17 Aug 1958	12	Lunar Orbiter 1; 18 Aug 1966	5	41.7%
Rover	19 Feb 1969	3	Luna 17; 17 Nov 1970	2	66.7%	Apollo 15; 31 July 1971	3	Apollo 15	3	100.0%
Sample return	14 Jun 1969	11	Luna 16; 24 Sep, 1970	3	27.3%	Apollo 11; 24 Jul 1969	7	Apollo 11	6	85.7%
Total		44		15	34.1%	Total	40		24	60.0%

== Mission details ==
Public name	Internal name	Photo	Mission	Launch date	Carrier rocket	Outcome	Remarks
N/A	E-1 No.1		Impactor	23 September 1958	Luna	Launch failure	Failed to orbit
N/A	E-1 No.2		Impactor	11 October 1958	Luna	Launch failure	Failed to orbit
N/A	E-1 No.3		Impactor	4 December 1958	Luna	Launch failure	Failed to orbit
Luna 1	E-1 No.4		Impactor	2 January 1959	Luna	Partial launch failure	Also known as Mechta; placed onto incorrect trajectory, flew past the Moon without impacting; first spacecraft to escape geocentric orbit
N/A	E-1A No.1		Impactor	18 June 1959	Luna	Launch failure	Failed to orbit
Luna 2	E-1A No.2		Impactor	12 September 1959	Luna	Successful	Impacted Palus Putredinis (29.10 N, 0.00 E) on the Moon on 14 September 1959 at ~07:30 GMT. First man-made object to reach the Moon.
Luna 3	E-2A No.1		Flyby	4 October 1959	Luna	Successful	Took first photographs of the far side of the Moon.
N/A	E-3 No.1		Flyby	15 April 1960	Luna	Launch failure	Failed to orbit
N/A	E-3 No.2		Flyby	16 April 1960	Luna	Launch failure	Failed to orbit
N/A	E-6 No.2		Lander	4 January 1963	Molniya-L	Launch failure	Never left LEO
N/A	E-6 No.3		Lander	3 February 1963	Molniya-L	Launch failure	Failed to orbit
Luna 4	E-6 No.4		Lander	2 April 1963	Molniya-L	Spacecraft failure	Failed to perform course correction manoeuvre; flew past the Moon
N/A	E-6 No.6		Lander	21 March 1964	Molniya-M	Launch failure	Failed to orbit
N/A	E-6 No.5		Lander	20 April 1964	Molniya-M	Launch failure	Failed to orbit
Kosmos 60	E-6 No.9		Lander	12 March 1965	Molniya-L	Launch failure	Never left LEO, decayed five days later
N/A	E-6 No.8		Lander	10 April 1965	Molniya-L	Launch failure	Failed to orbit
Luna 5	E-6 No.10		Lander	9 May 1965	Molniya-M	Spacecraft failure	Failed to decelerate; impacted Mare Nubium
Luna 6	E-6 No.7		Lander	8 June 1965	Molniya-M	Spacecraft failure	Failed to perform course correction manoeuvre; flew past the Moon
Luna 7	E-6 No.11		Lander	4 October 1965	Molniya	Spacecraft failure	Attitude control failure; impacted Oceanus Procellarum
Luna 8	E-6 No.12		Lander	3 December 1965	Molniya	Spacecraft failure	Attitude control failure; impacted Oceanus Procellarum
Luna 9	E-6 No.13		Lander	31 January 1966	Molniya-M	Successful	Landed in Oceanus Procellarum (7.08 N, 295.63 E) 18:44:52 GMT on 3 February 1966. First soft landing on the Moon.
Kosmos 111	E-6S No.204		Orbiter	1 March 1966	Molniya-M	Launch failure	Never left LEO, decayed two days later
Luna 10	E-6S No.206		Orbiter	31 March 1966	Molniya-M	Successful	
Luna 11	E-6LF No.101		Orbiter	24 August 1966	Molniya-M	Successful	
Luna 12	E-6LF No.102		Orbiter	22 October 1966	Molniya-M	Successful	
Luna 13	E-6M No.205		Lander	21 December 1966	Molniya-M	Successful	Landed in Oceanus Procellarum (18.87 N, 297.95 E) 18:01 GMT on 24 December 1966
N/A	E-6LS No.112		Orbiter	7 February 1968	Molniya-M	Launch failure	Failed to orbit
Luna 14	E-6LS No.113		Orbiter	7 April 1968	Molniya-M	Successful	
N/A	E-8 No.201		Rover	19 February 1969	Proton-K/D	Launch failure	First attempt to launch Lunokhod. Failed to orbit, Lunokhod destroyed.
N/A	E-8-5 No.402		Sample return	14 June 1969	Proton-K/D	Launch failure	Failed to orbit
Luna 15	E-8-5 No.401		Sample return	13 July 1969	Proton-K/D	Spacecraft failure	Entered selenocentric orbit successfully, failed during descent on 21 July 1969; impacted the Moon while Apollo 11 was on the surface
Kosmos 300	E-8-5 No.403		Sample return	23 September 1969	Proton-K/D	Launch failure	Never left LEO, decayed four days later
Kosmos 305	E-8-5 No.404		Sample return	22 October 1969	Proton-K/D	Launch failure	Never left LEO, decayed two days later
N/A	E-8-5 No.405		Sample return	6 February 1970	Proton-K/D	Launch failure	Failed to orbit
Luna 16	E-8-5 No.406		Sample return	12 September 1970	Proton-K/D	Successful	Landed in Mare Fecunditatis (0.68 S, 56.30 E) at 05:18 GMT on 20 September 1970. Sample returned to Earth on 24 September 1970
Luna 17	E-8 No.203		Rover	10 November 1970	Proton-K/D	Successful	Landed in Mare Imbrium (38.28 N, 325.00 E) at 03:47 GMT on 17 November 1970. Deployed Lunokhod 1
Luna 18	E-8-5 No.407		Sample return	2 September 1971	Proton-K/D	Spacecraft failure	Entered selenocentric orbit successfully, failed during descent; impacted Mare Fecunditatis (3.57 N, 50.50 E)
Luna 19	E-8LS No.202		Orbiter	28 September 1971	Proton-K/D	Successful	
Luna 20	E-8-5 No.408		Sample return	14 February 1972	Proton-K/D	Successful	Landed in Mare Fecunditatis (3.57 N, 56.50 E) at 19:19 UTC on 21 February 1972. Sample returned to Earth on 25 February 1972
Luna 21	E-8 No.204		Rover	8 January 1973	Proton-K/D	Successful	Landed in Le Monnier (25.85 N, 30.45 E) at 23:35 UTC on 15 January 1973. Deployed Lunokhod 2
Luna 22	E-8LS No.206		Orbiter	29 May 1974	Proton-K/D	Successful	
Luna 23	E-8-5M No.410		Sample return	28 October 1974	Proton-K/D	Spacecraft failure	Landed in Mare Crisium, fell over upon landing
N/A	E-8-5M No.412		Sample return	16 October 1975	Proton-K/D	Launch failure	Failed to orbit, intended to return a sample from Mare Crisium
Luna 24	E-8-5M No.413		Sample return	9 August 1976	Proton-K/D	Successful	Landed in Mare Crisium (12.25 N, 62.20 E) at 02:00 UTC on 18 August 1976. Sample returned to Earth on 22 August 1976

== See also ==
- Luna (rocket)
- Luna-Glob
- List of missions to the Moon
- Soviet crewed lunar programs
- Soviet space program
- Surveyor program
- Pioneer program
- Ranger program
