= Luna 19 =

Soviet lunar orbiter

- Mission type: Lunar orbiter
- Operator: Soviet space program
- COSPAR ID: 1971-082A
- SATCAT no.: 5488
- Mission duration: Between 371 and 388 days (launch to last contact)

Spacecraft properties
- Spacecraft type: E-8-LS
- Manufacturer: GSMZ Lavochkin
- Launch mass: 5,600 kilograms (12,300 lb)
- Dry mass: 5,600 kilograms (12,300 lb)

Start of mission
- Launch date: 28 September 1971, 10:00:22 UTC
- Rocket: Proton-K/D
- Launch site: Baikonur 81/24

End of mission
- Deactivated: c. 20 October 1972
- Last contact: 1 November 1972

Orbital parameters
- Reference system: Selenocentric
- Eccentricity: 0.18
- Periselene altitude: 140 kilometres (87 mi)
- Aposelene altitude: 140 kilometres (87 mi)
- Inclination: 40.58 degrees
- Period: 121.13 minutes

Lunar orbiter
- Orbital insertion: 3 October 1971
- Orbits: ~4,315

Instruments
- Imaging system Gamma-ray spectrometer Radio altimeter Meteoroid detectors Magnetometer; Cosmic-ray detectors Radiation detectors

Luna 19 (a.k.a. Lunik 19) (E-8-LS series), was an uncrewed space mission of the Luna program. Luna 19 extended the systematic study of lunar gravitational fields and location of mascons (mass concentrations). It also studied the lunar radiation environment, the gamma-active lunar surface, and the solar wind. Photographic coverage via a television system was also obtained.

== Overview ==
Luna 19 was the first of the “advanced” lunar orbiters whose design was based upon the same Ye-8-class bus used for the lunar rovers and the sample collectors. For these orbiters, designated Ye-8LS, the basic “lander stage” was topped off by a wheelless Lunokhod-like frame that housed all scientific instrumentation in a pressurized container.

Luna 19 was launched into an Earth parking orbit on 28 September, of the year 1971 and, from this orbit, was sent toward the Moon. Luna 19 entered an orbit around the Moon on 2 October 1971 after two midcourse corrections on 29 September and 1 October. Initial orbital parameters were 140 x 140 kilometers at 40.58° inclination.

Soon afterward, the spacecraft began its main imaging mission — providing panoramic images of the mountainous region of the Moon between 30° and 60° south latitude and between 20° and 80° east longitude. Other scientific experiments included extensive studies on the shape and strength of the lunar gravitational field and the locations of the mascons. Occultation experiments in May and June 1972 allowed scientists to determine the concentration of charged particles at an altitude of 10 kilometers. Additional studies of the solar wind were evidently coordinated with those performed by the Mars 2 and 3 orbiters and Veneras 7 and 8. Communications with Luna 19 was lost on 1 November 1972, after a year of operation and more than 4,000 orbits around the Moon.

== See also ==
- Timeline of artificial satellites and space probes
