= Luna 15 =

1969 Soviet space probe

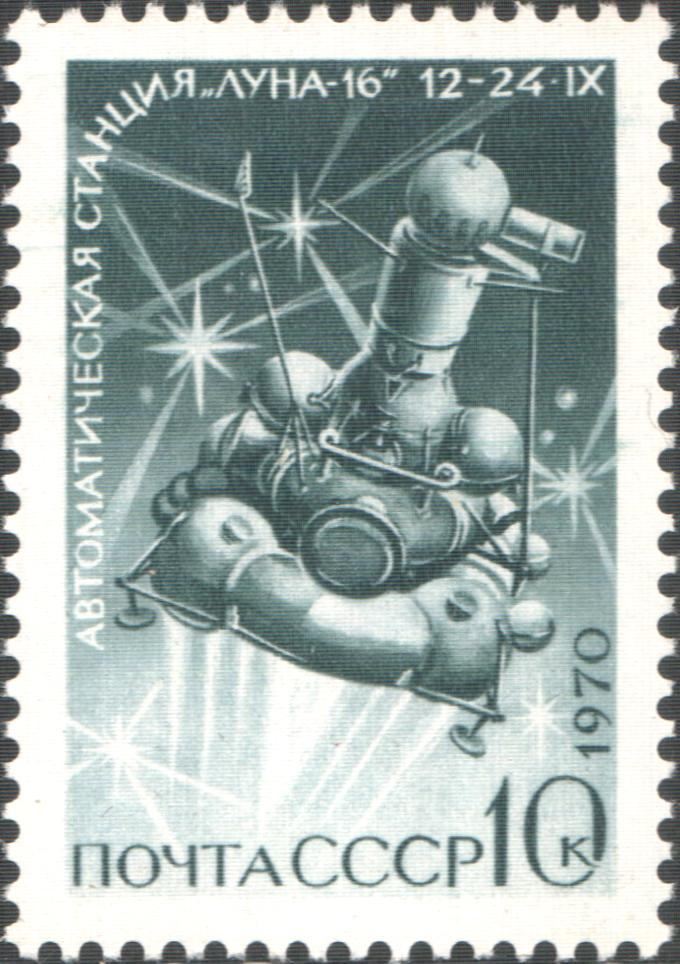
- Soviet postage stamp depicting the Luna 16 spacecraft, similar to Luna 15
- Mission type: Lunar sample return
- Operator: Soviet space program
- COSPAR ID: 1969-058A
- SATCAT no.: 4036
- Mission duration: 8 days achieved

Spacecraft properties
- Bus: Ye-8-5
- Manufacturer: GSMZ Lavochkin
- Launch mass: 5,667 kg (12,494 lb)
- Dry mass: 2,718 kg (5,992 lb)

Start of mission
- Launch date: 13 July 1969, 02:54:42 UTC
- Rocket: Proton-K/D
- Launch site: Baikonur 81/24

End of mission
- Destroyed: 21 July 1969, 15:51 UTC

Orbital parameters
- Reference system: Selenocentric

Lunar orbiter
- Orbital insertion: 17 July 1969, 10:00 UTC

Lunar impact (failed landing)
- Impact date: 21 July 1969, 15:51 UTC
- Impact site: 17°N 60°E

Instruments
- Stereo imaging system; Remote arm for sample collection; Radiation detector

Luna 15 was a robotic space mission of the Soviet Luna programme that was in lunar orbit at the same time as the Apollo 11 spacecraft.

On 21 July 1969, while Apollo 11 astronauts finished the first human moonwalk, Luna 15, a robotic Soviet spacecraft in lunar orbit at the time, began its descent to the lunar surface. Launched three days before the Apollo 11 mission, it was the second Soviet attempt to bring lunar soil back to Earth, with the goal of beating the US in achieving the first sample return in the Moon race. The previous mission, designated E-8-5-402, launched on 14 June 1969, did not achieve Earth orbit because the third stage of its launch vehicle failed to ignite. The Luna 15 lander crashed into the Moon at 15:50 UT, hours before the scheduled American launch from the lunar surface.

== Mission ==
Luna 15 was designed to study space around the Moon, the lunar gravitational field, and the chemical composition of lunar rocks. It could also photograph the lunar surface. It was placed in an intermediate Earth orbit after launch and was then sent toward the Moon. After a mid-course correction the day after launch, the spacecraft entered lunar orbit at 10:00 UT on 17 July 1969. It remained in lunar orbit for two days, while controllers checked its systems, and performed two orbital manoeuvres.

After completing 86 communications sessions and 52 orbits of the Moon at various inclinations and altitudes, it began its descent. Astronauts Neil Armstrong and Buzz Aldrin had already set foot on the Moon when Luna 15 fired its main retrorocket engine to initiate descent to the surface at 15:47 UT on 21 July 1969. Transmissions ceased four minutes after de-orbit, at a calculated altitude of 3 kilometres (1.9 mi). The spacecraft had crashed, probably into the side of a mountain.

Impact coordinates were 17° north latitude and 60° east longitude, in Mare Crisium. Luna's impact site is some 554 kilometres (344 mi) north-northeast of the Apollo 11 landing site, on a bearing of 328 degrees. An audio recording of the minutes in which British technicians at the radio telescope facility in Jodrell Bank observed Luna 15's descent was first made available to the public on 3 July 2009.

== Implications ==
The simultaneous missions became one of the first instances of Soviet–American space-related communication: the Soviet Union released Luna 15's flight plan to ensure it would not collide with Apollo 11, although its exact mission was not publicized.

In a race to reach the Moon and return to Earth, the parallel missions of Luna 15 and Apollo 11 represented, in some ways, the culmination of the Space Race between the space programmes of the United States and the Soviet Union in the 1960s.

“I say, this has really been drama of the highest order,”

— A British astronomer monitoring Luna 15 from Jodrell Bank, as it prematurely left orbit and hit the moon surface at 15:50 UTC, two hours before Apollo 11's return ascent

== See also ==
- List of missions to the Moon
