= Luna 6 =

Space probe

- Mission type: Lunar lander
- Operator: Soviet space program
- COSPAR ID: 1965-044A
- SATCAT no.: 01393
- Mission duration: 10 days

Spacecraft properties
- Spacecraft type: Ye-6
- Manufacturer: OKB-1
- Launch mass: 1,442 kilograms (3,179 lb)

Start of mission
- Launch date: 8 June 1965, 07:41:00 UTC
- Rocket: Molniya-M 8K78M
- Launch site: Baikonur 1/5

End of mission
- Last contact: Cosmic radiation measurement ended 18 June 1965

Orbital parameters
- Reference system: Heliocentric

Lunar flyby (failed landing)
- Closest approach: 11 June 1965
- Distance: 160,000 kilometres (99,000 mi)

Luna 6, or E-6 No.7 (Ye-6 series) was an uncrewed Soviet spacecraft which was intended to perform a landing on the Moon as part of the Luna program. Due to the failure of a mid-course correction manoeuvre, Luna 6 failed to land, instead flying past the Moon at a distance of 160,000 kilometres (99,000 mi).

== Launch ==
Luna 6 was launched by a Molniya-M carrier rocket flying from Site 1/5 at the Baikonur Cosmodrome. Liftoff occurred at 07:40 UTC on 8 June 1965, with the spacecraft and Blok L upper stage entering a low Earth parking orbit, before the upper stage propelled the spacecraft into a heliocentric orbit passing the Moon.

== Failure ==
The Luna 6 mission proceeded as planned until a scheduled mid-course correction late on 9 June. Although the spacecraft's S5.5A main engine ignited on time, it failed to cut off and continued to fire until its propellant supply was exhausted. An investigation later determined that the problem had been due to a command which had been mistakenly sent to the timer that ordered the main engine to shut down.

Despite the spacecraft being unable to land on the Moon, controllers used the spacecraft to simulate a landing; a task which was satisfactorily accomplished. Luna 6 flew past the Moon late on 11 June, with a closest approach of 159,612.8 kilometres (99,178.8 mi). Contact was maintained to a distance of 600,000 kilometres (370,000 mi) from Earth.
