= Luna 10 =

First artificial satellite of the Moon

- Mission type: Lunar orbiter
- Operator: Soviet space program
- COSPAR ID: 1966-027A
- SATCAT no.: 02126
- Mission duration: 60 days

Spacecraft properties
- Spacecraft type: E-6S
- Manufacturer: GSMZ Lavochkin
- Launch mass: 1,583.7 kg
- Dry mass: 540 kg

Start of mission
- Launch date: 31 March 1966, 10:46:59 UTC
- Rocket: Molniya-M 8K78M
- Launch site: Baikonur, Site 31/6

End of mission
- Last contact: 30 May 1966

Orbital parameters
- Reference system: Selenocentric
- Periselene altitude: 349 km
- Aposelene altitude: 1015 km
- Inclination: 71.9°
- Period: 178.05 minutes

Lunar orbiter
- Orbital insertion: 3 April 1966, 18:44 GMT

Instruments
- Magnetometer; Gamma-ray spectrometer Five gas-discharge counters Two ion traps/charged particle trap Piezoelectric micrometeorite detector Infrared detector Low-energy x-ray photon counters

Luna 10 (Russian: Луна-10, lit. 'Moon-10') or Lunik 10 was a 1966 Soviet lunar robotic spacecraft mission in the Luna program. It was the first artificial satellite of the Moon, and any other body other than Earth and the Sun (in heliocentric orbit).

Luna 10 conducted extensive research in lunar orbit, gathering important data on the strength of the Moon's magnetic field, its radiation belts, and the nature of lunar rocks (which were found to be comparable to terrestrial basalt rocks), cosmic radiation, and micrometeoroid density. Perhaps its most important finding was the first evidence of mass concentrations (called "mascons")—areas of denser material below the lunar surface that distort lunar orbital trajectories. The craft's gamma-ray spectrometer allowed the detection of radioactive uranium, thorium, and potassium-40 on the Moon.

== The spacecraft ==
Part of the E-6S series, Luna 10 was battery powered and had an on-orbit dry mass of 540 kg. Scientific instruments included a gamma-ray spectrometer for energies between 0.3–3 MeV (50–500 pJ), a triaxial magnetometer, a meteorite detector, instruments for solar-plasma studies, and devices for measuring infrared emissions from the Moon and radiation conditions of the lunar environment. Gravitational studies were also conducted.

== The flight ==
Luna 10 was launched towards the Moon on 31 March 1966 at 10:48 GMT.

After a midcourse correction on 1 April, the spacecraft entered lunar orbit on 3 April 1966 and completed its first orbit three hours later (on 4 April Moscow time). A 245-kilogram instrument compartment separated from the main bus, which was in a 218 x 621 mile orbit inclined at 71.9° to the lunar equator.

Luna 10 operated for 460 lunar orbits and performed 219 active data transmissions before radio signals were discontinued on 30 May 1966. The spacecraft eventually crashed on the Moon on an unknown date.

On 8 November 1966, Alexander Vinogradov and colleagues at the USSR Academy of Sciences published the detection by Luna 10's gamma-ray spectrometer of radiation from uranium, thorium, and potassium on the Moon's surface. These findings were used to identify the lunar mare rock as similar to Earth's basalts, while the lunar highlands corresponded to Earth's ultramafic rocks. The natural nuclear reactions provided 10% of the lunar surface gamma radiation, and the remaining 90% was caused by cosmic rays. Luna 10 also detected in its immediate orbital environment a meteoroid density 100 times higher than that in interplanetary space.

== The Internationale ==
The spacecraft carried a set of solid-state oscillators that had been programmed to reproduce the notes of "The Internationale", so that it could be broadcast live to the 23rd Congress of the Communist Party of the Soviet Union. During a rehearsal on the night of 3 April, the playback went well, but the following morning, controllers discovered a missing note and played the previous night's tape to the assembled gathering at the Congress—claiming it was a live broadcast from the Moon.

== Gallery ==
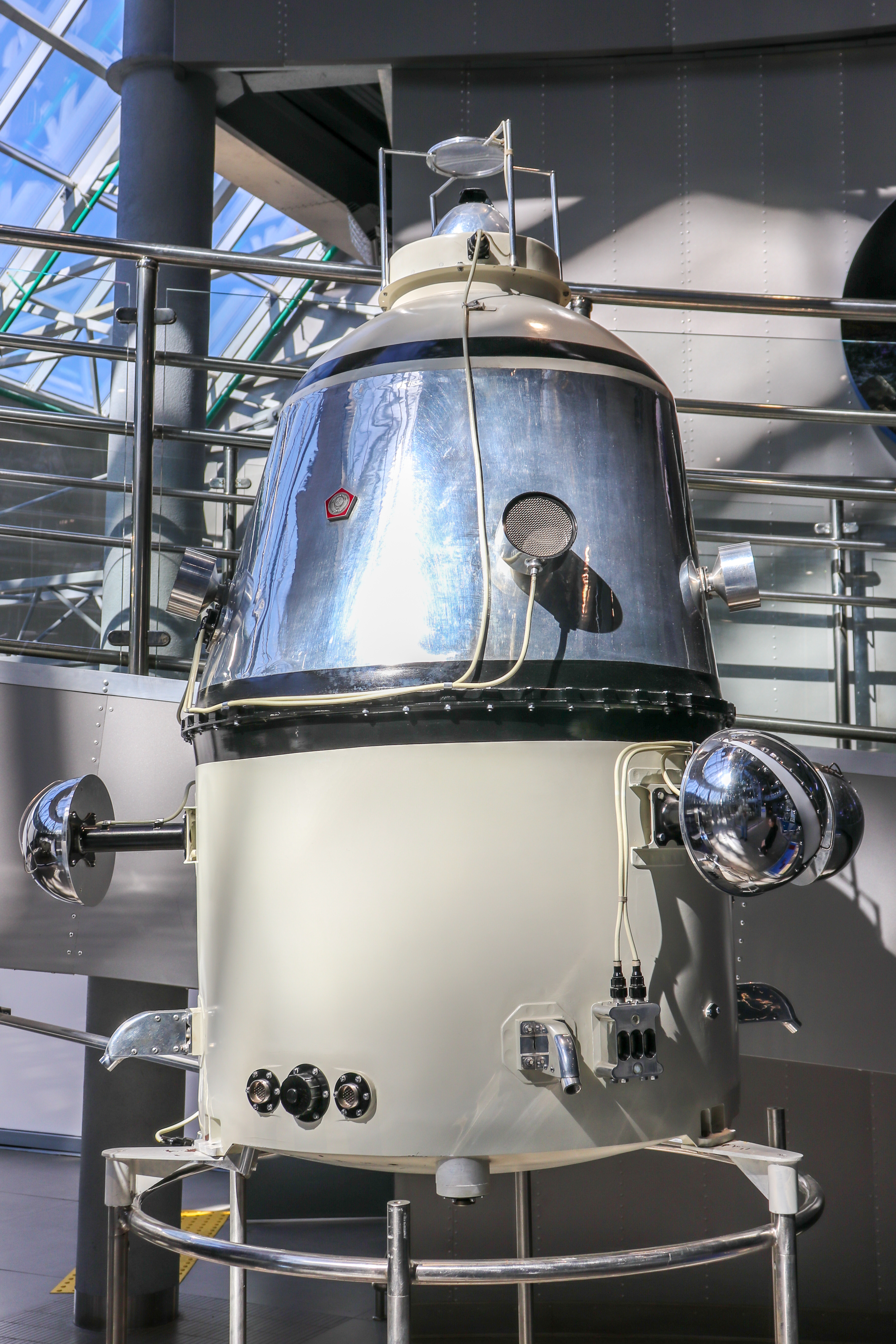
Replica of Luna 10, Tsiolkovsky State Museum of the History of Cosmonautics

Luna 10 model (suspended), Memorial Museum of Cosmonautics

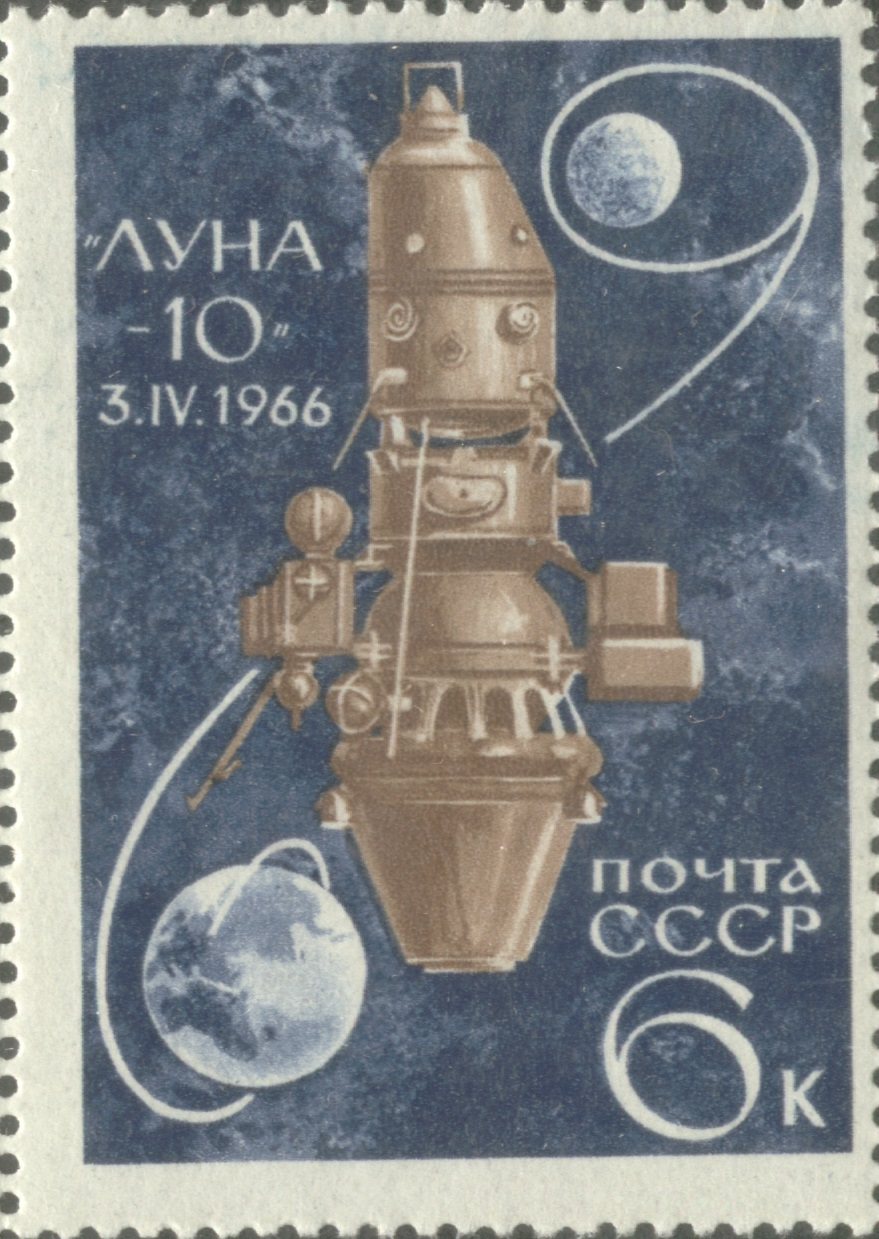
Commemorative stamp

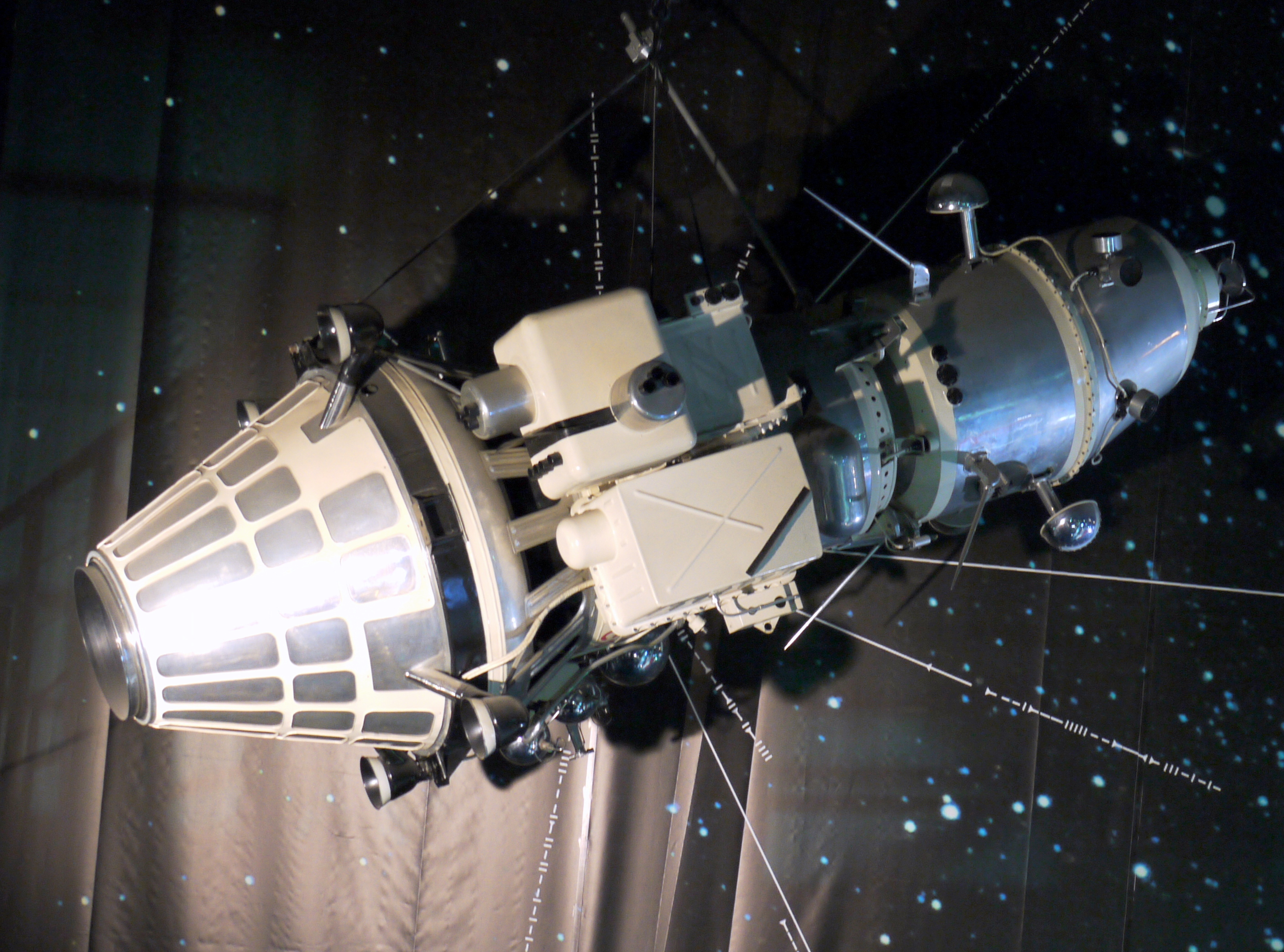
Luna 10 mockup at Museum of Air and Space
