= List of missions to the Moon =

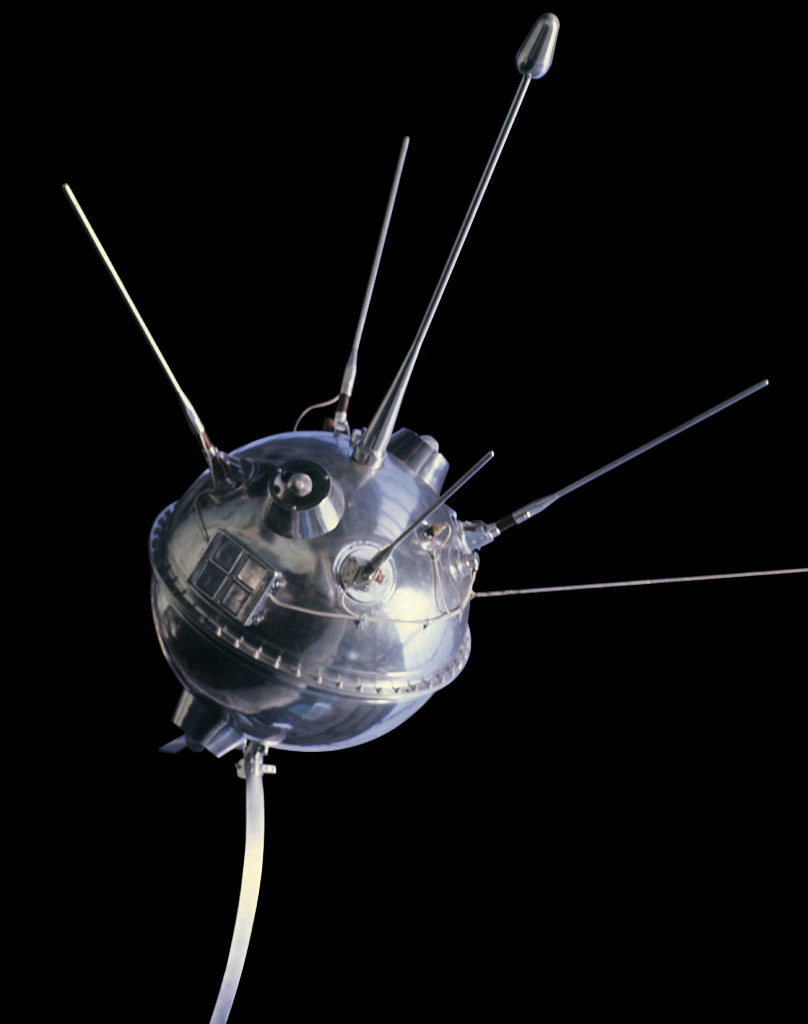
The Soviet Luna programme was the first successful lunar programme, its Luna 1 (1959) being the first partially successful lunar mission

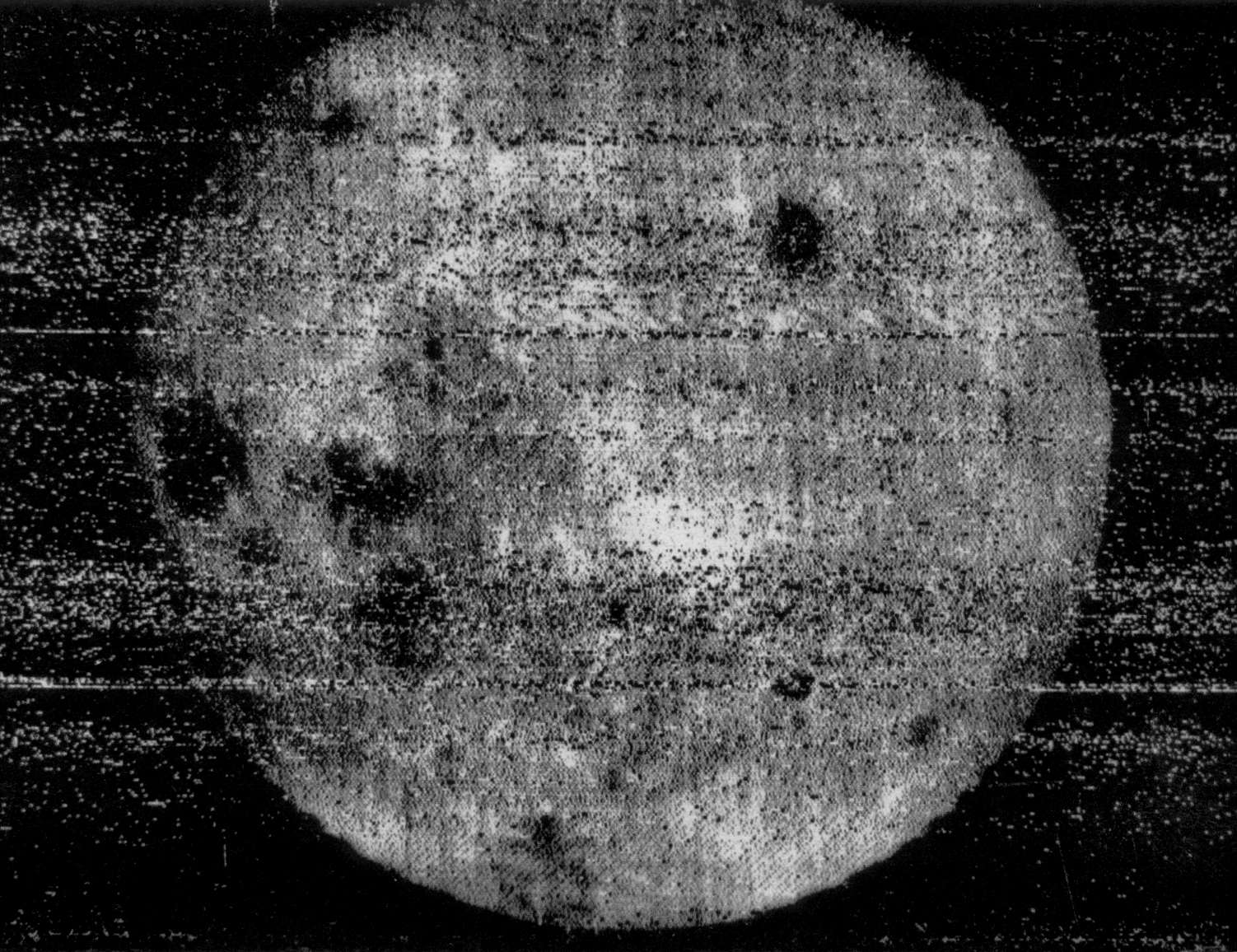
The first image taken of the far side of the Moon, returned by Luna 3 (1959)

Missions to the Moon have been numerous and represent some of the earliest endeavours in space missions, with continuous exploration of the Moon beginning in 1959.

The first partially successful lunar mission was Luna 1 in January 1959, which became the first probe to escape Earth's gravity and perform a flyby of another astronomical body, passing near the Moon. Soon after, the first Moon landing—and the first landing on any extraterrestrial body—was carried out by Luna 2, which intentionally impacted the Moon on 14 September 1959. The far side of the Moon, permanently hidden from Earth due to tidal locking, was imaged for the first time by Luna 3 on 7 October 1959, revealing terrain never before seen.

Significant advances continued throughout the 1960s. In 1966, Luna 9 achieved the first controlled soft landing on the lunar surface, followed later that year by Luna 10, the first spacecraft to enter orbit around the Moon. In 1968, the Zond 5 mission became the first to carry terrestrial lifeforms—specifically tortoises—on a circumlunar approach that brought them close to the Moon and returned them safely to Earth, demonstrating biological viability in deep space.

The first crewed missions to the Moon were undertaken by the United States, forming the pinnacle of the Space Race. While the Soviet programme pivoted toward robotic sample return missions, the American Apollo program advanced through a sequence of increasingly complex missions. In December 1968, Apollo 8 became the first crewed spacecraft to orbit the Moon. On 20 July 1969, Apollo 11 accomplished the first crewed landing on the lunar surface, during which Neil Armstrong became the first human to set foot on the Moon. Concurrently, the Soviet Luna 15 robotic mission was also orbiting the Moon, marking the first known instance of simultaneous extraterrestrial operations by different nations.

Between 1969 and 1972, the United States carried out six successful Apollo landings, while the Soviet Union continued deploying uncrewed probes, including the Lunokhod programme—the first extraterrestrial rovers—and sample return missions through 1976. Following this period, there was a gap in dedicated lunar missions lasting until 1990. Since then, renewed interest in lunar exploration has seen additional missions conducted by a broader range of spacefaring entities. In roughly chronological order following the Soviet Union and the United States, the Moon has also been visited by the European Space Agency (ESA), Japan Aerospace Exploration Agency (JAXA), China National Space Administration (CNSA), Indian Space Research Organisation (ISRO), Italian Space Agency (ASI), Korea AeroSpace Administration (KASA), the United Arab Emirates Space Agency (UAESA), and Pakistan's Space & Upper Atmosphere Research Commission (SUPARCO).

In 2018, the far side of the Moon was targeted for the first time by a landing mission. On 3 January 2019, China's Chang'e 4 mission successfully landed in the Aitken basin, deploying the Yutu-2 rover, which commenced scientific operations on the unexplored lunar hemisphere. Five years later, China launched the Chang'e 6 sample return mission to the far side. Its lander touched down in Apollo crater on 1 June 2024 and collected the first lunar samples retrieved from the Moon's far hemisphere.

The first commercial mission to the Moon was the Manfred Memorial Moon Mission (4M), developed by LuxSpace, a subsidiary of the German aerospace company OHB AG, Launched on 23 October 2014 with the mission flying as a secondary payload aboard CNSA's Chang'e 5-T1 spacecraft.

The Moon has also been visited by a small number of spacecraft not dedicated to lunar study. Of these, four executed flybys using the Moon for gravity assist manoeuvres to alter their interplanetary trajectories. In addition, Explorer 49, a radio astronomy satellite launched by the United States in 1973, was placed into selenocentric orbit where the Moon itself served as a shield from terrestrial radio interference, enabling observations of deep-space radio signals.

== 20th century ==
Legend

⚀ Cubesat or similar

Mission		Launch date	Operator	Carrier rocket	Spacecraft	Mission type	Outcome
1	Pioneer 0 (Able I)	17 August 1958	(United States) USAF	Thor DM-18 Able I	Pioneer 0	Orbiter	Launch failure
1	Pioneer 0 (Able I)	First attempted launch beyond Earth orbit; failed to orbit due to turbopump gearbox malfunction resulting in first-stage explosion. Reached apogee of 16 kilometres (10 mi).					
2	Luna E-1 No.1	23 September 1958	(Soviet Union) OKB-1	Luna	Luna E-1 No.1	Impactor	Launch failure
2	Luna E-1 No.1	Failed to orbit; rocket disintegrated due to excessive vibration.					
3	Pioneer 1 (Able II)	11 October 1958	(United States) NASA	Thor DM-18 Able I	Pioneer 1	Orbiter	Launch failure
3	Pioneer 1 (Able II)	Failed to orbit; premature second-stage cutoff due to accelerometer failure. Later known as Pioneer 1. Reached apogee of 113,800 kilometres (70,700 mi).					
4	Luna E-1 No.2	11 October 1958	(Soviet Union) OKB-1	Luna	Luna E-1 No.2	Impactor	Launch failure
4	Luna E-1 No.2	Failed to orbit; carrier rocket exploded due to excessive vibration.					
5	Pioneer 2 (Able III)	8 November 1958	(United States) NASA	Thor DM-18 Able I	Pioneer 2	Orbiter	Launch failure
5	Pioneer 2 (Able III)	Failed to orbit; premature second-stage cutoff due to erroneous command by ground controllers; third stage failed to ignite due to broken electrical connection. Reached apogee of 1,550 kilometres (960 mi).					
6	Luna E-1 No.3	4 December 1958	(Soviet Union) OKB-1	Luna	Luna E-1 No.3	Impactor	Launch failure
6	Luna E-1 No.3	Failed to orbit; seal failure in hydrogen peroxide pump cooling system resulted in core-stage underperformance.					
7	Pioneer 3	6 December 1958	(United States) NASA	Juno II	Pioneer 3	Flyby	Launch failure
7	Pioneer 3	Failed to orbit; premature first-stage cutoff. Reached apogee of 102,360 kilometres (63,600 mi).					
8	Luna 1 (E-1 No.4)	2 January 1959	(Soviet Union) OKB-1	Luna	Luna 1	Impactor	Partial failure
8	Luna 1 (E-1 No.4)	Carrier rocket guidance problem resulted in failure to impact Moon, flew past in a heliocentric orbit. Closest approach 5,995 kilometres (3,725 mi) on 4 January. First spacecraft to fly by the Moon.					
9	Pioneer 4	3 March 1959	(United States) NASA	Juno II	Pioneer 4	Flyby	Partial failure
9	Pioneer 4	Second-stage overperformance resulted in flyby at greater altitude than expected, out of instrument range, with 58,983 kilometres (36,650 mi) of distance. Closest approach at 22:25 UTC on 4 March. First U.S. spacecraft to leave Earth orbit.					
10	E-1A No.1	18 June 1959	(Soviet Union) OKB-1	Luna	E-1A No.1	Impactor	Launch failure
10	E-1A No.1	Failed to orbit; guidance system malfunction.					
11	Luna 2 (E-1A No.2)	12 September 1959	(Soviet Union) OKB-1	Luna	Luna 2	Impactor	Success
11	Luna 2 (E-1A No.2)	Successful impact at 21:02 on 14 September 1959. First spacecraft to impact the lunar surface. This made the Soviet Union the first country to impact the surface of the Moon.					
12	Luna 3 (E-2A No.1)	4 October 1959	(Soviet Union) OKB-1	Luna	Luna 3	Flyby	Success
12	Luna 3 (E-2A No.1)	Returned the first images of the far side of the Moon.					
13	Pioneer P-3 Able IVB	26 November 1959	(United States) NASA	Atlas-D Able	Pioneer P-3	Orbiter	Launch failure
13	Pioneer P-3 Able IVB	Failed to orbit; payload fairing disintegrated due to design fault.					
14	Luna E-3 No.1	15 April 1960	(Soviet Union) OKB-1	Luna	Luna E-3 No.1	Flyby	Launch failure
14	Luna E-3 No.1	Failed to orbit; premature third-stage cutoff.					
15	Luna E-3 No.2	16 April 1960	(Soviet Union) OKB-1	Luna	Luna E-3 No.2	Flyby	Launch failure
15	Luna E-3 No.2	Failed to orbit; rocket disintegrated ten seconds after launch.					
16	Pioneer P-30 (Able VA)	25 September 1960	(United States) NASA	Atlas-D Able	Pioneer P-30	Orbiter	Launch failure
16	Pioneer P-30 (Able VA)	Failed to orbit; second-stage oxidizer system malfunction resulting in premature cutoff.					
17	Pioneer P-31 (Able VB)	15 December 1960	(United States) NASA	Atlas-D Able	Pioneer P-31	Orbiter	Launch failure
17	Pioneer P-31 (Able VB)	Failed to orbit, exploded 68 seconds after launch, at an altitude of 12.2 kilometres (7.6 mi). Second stage ignited while first stage was still attached and burning.					
18	Ranger 3 (P-34)	26 January 1962	(United States) NASA	Atlas LV-3 Agena-B	Ranger 3	Impactor	Spacecraft failure
18	Ranger 3 (P-34)	26 January 1962	(United States) NASA	Atlas LV-3 Agena-B	Ranger 3 lander	Lander	Spacecraft failure
18	Ranger 3 (P-34)	Partial launch failure due to guidance problem; attempt to correct using spacecraft's engine resulted in it missing the Moon by 36,793 kilometres (22,862 mi).					
19	Ranger 4 (P-35)	23 April 1962	(United States) NASA	Atlas LV-3 Agena-B	Ranger 4	Impactor	Spacecraft failure
19	Ranger 4 (P-35)	23 April 1962	(United States) NASA	Atlas LV-3 Agena-B	Ranger 4 lander	Lander	Spacecraft failure
19	Ranger 4 (P-35)	Failed to deploy solar panels, ran out of power ten hours after launch; incidental impact on the far side of the Moon on 26 April. First spacecraft to impact the far side of the Moon. The impact made the United States the 2nd country to impact the surface of the Moon.					
20	Ranger 5 (P-36)	18 October 1962	(United States) NASA	Atlas LV-3 Agena-B	Ranger 5	Impactor	Spacecraft failure
20	Ranger 5 (P-36)	18 October 1962	(United States) NASA	Atlas LV-3 Agena-B	Ranger 5 lander	Lander	Spacecraft failure
20	Ranger 5 (P-36)	Solar panels erroneously disengaged from power system, failed 8 3/4 hours after launch when batteries were depleted. Missed the Moon as course correction was not completed.					
21	Luna E-6 No.2	4 January 1963	(Soviet Union) OKB-1	Molniya-L	Luna E-6 No.2	Lander	Launch failure
21	Luna E-6 No.2	Failed to depart Low Earth orbit; guidance system power failure prevented upper-stage ignition.					
22	Luna E-6 No.3	3 February 1963	(Soviet Union) OKB-1	Molniya-L	Luna E-6 No.3	Lander	Launch failure
22	Luna E-6 No.3	Failed to orbit; guidance failure.					
23	Luna 4 (E-6 No.4)	2 April 1963	(Soviet Union) OKB-1	Molniya-L	Luna 4	Lander	Spacecraft failure
23	Luna 4 (E-6 No.4)	Failed to perform mid-course correction, remained in high Earth orbit until given escape velocity by orbital perturbation.					
24	Ranger 6 (P-54)	30 January 1964	(United States) NASA	Atlas LV-3 Agena-B	Ranger 6	Impactor	Spacecraft failure
24	Ranger 6 (P-54)	Impacted on 2 February 1964, failed to return images due to power system failure.					
25	Luna E-6 No.6	21 March 1964	(Soviet Union) OKB-1	Molniya-M	Luna E-6 No.6	Lander	Launch failure
25	Luna E-6 No.6	Failed to orbit; third stage underperformed due to oxidiser valve failure.					
26	Luna E-6 No.5	20 April 1964	(Soviet Union) OKB-1	Molniya-M	Luna E-6 No.5	Lander	Launch failure
26	Luna E-6 No.5	Failed to orbit; power failure caused by broken connection resulted in premature third-stage cutoff.					
27	Ranger 7	28 July 1964	(United States) NASA	Atlas LV-3 Agena-B	Ranger 7	Impactor	Success
27	Ranger 7	Impacted on 30 July 1964 at 13:25:48 UTC.					
28	Ranger 8	17 February 1965	(United States) NASA	Atlas LV-3 Agena-B	Ranger 8	Impactor	Success
28	Ranger 8	Impacted on 20 February 1965 at 09:57:37 UTC.					
29	Kosmos 60 (E-6 No.9)	12 March 1965	(Soviet Union) Lavochkin	Molniya-L	Kosmos 60	Lander	Launch failure
29	Kosmos 60 (E-6 No.9)	Upper stage failed to restart due to guidance system short circuit, Failed to depart low Earth orbit.					
30	Ranger 9	21 March 1965	(United States) NASA	Atlas LV-3 Agena-B	Ranger 9	Impactor	Success
30	Ranger 9	Impacted on 24 March 1965 at 14:08:20 UTC.					
31	Luna E-6 No.8	10 April 1965	(Soviet Union) Lavochkin	Molniya-L	Luna E-6 No.8	Lander	Spacecraft failure
31	Luna E-6 No.8	Third stage failed to ignite due to loss of oxidiser pressure, failed to orbit.					
32	Luna 5 (E-6 No.10)	9 May 1965	(Soviet Union) Lavochkin	Molniya-M	Luna 5	Lander	Spacecraft failure
32	Luna 5 (E-6 No.10)	Loss of control after gyroscope malfunction, failed to decelerate for landing and impacted the Moon at 19:10 UTC on 12 May 1965.					
33	Luna 6 (E-6 No.7)	8 June 1965	(Soviet Union) Lavochkin	Molniya-M	Luna 6	Lander	Spacecraft failure
33	Luna 6 (E-6 No.7)	Engine failed to shut down after performing mid-course correction manoeuvre, flew past the Moon in a heliocentric orbit.					
34	Zond 3 (3MV-4 No.3)	18 July 1965	(Soviet Union) Lavochkin	Molniya	Zond 3	Flyby	Success
34	Zond 3 (3MV-4 No.3)	Flew past the Moon on 20 July 1965 at a distance of 9,200 kilometres (5,700 mi). Conducted technology demonstration for future planetary missions.					
35	Luna 7 (E-6 No.11)	4 October 1965	(Soviet Union) Lavochkin	Molniya	Luna 7	Lander	Spacecraft failure
35	Luna 7 (E-6 No.11)	Attitude control failure shortly before landing prevented controlled descent; impacted the lunar surface 22:08:24 UTC on 7 October 1965.					
36	Luna 8 (E-6 No.12)	3 December 1965	(Soviet Union) Lavochkin	Molniya	Luna 8	Lander	Spacecraft failure
36	Luna 8 (E-6 No.12)	Landing airbag punctured, resulting in loss of attitude control shortly before planned touchdown, impacted Moon on 6 December 1965 at 21:51:30 UTC.					
37	Luna 9 (E-6 No.13)	31 January 1966	(Soviet Union) Lavochkin	Molniya-M	Luna 9	Lander	Success
37	Luna 9 (E-6 No.13)	First spacecraft to land successfully on the Moon. Touchdown on 3 February 1966 at 18:45:30 UTC. Returned data until 6 February at 22:55 UTC. With its soft landing, the Soviet Union became the first country to successfully land on the lunar surface.					
38	Kosmos 111 (E-6S No.204)	1 March 1966	(Soviet Union) Lavochkin	Molniya-M	Kosmos 111	Orbiter	Launch failure
38	Kosmos 111 (E-6S No.204)	Upper stage lost attitude control and failed to ignite; spacecraft never left low Earth orbit.					
39	Luna 10 (E-6S No.206)	31 March 1966	(Soviet Union) Lavochkin	Molniya-M	Luna 10	Orbiter	Success
39	Luna 10 (E-6S No.206)	Entered orbit at 18:44 UTC on 3 April 1966, becoming the first spacecraft to orbit the Moon. Continued to return data until 30 May.					
40	Surveyor 1	30 May 1966	(United States) NASA	Atlas LV-3C Centaur-D	Surveyor 1	Lander	Success
40	Surveyor 1	Landed in Oceanus Procellarum on 2 June 1966 at 06:17:36 UTC. Returned data until loss of power on 13 July. With its soft landing, the United States became the second country to successfully land on the lunar surface.					
41	Explorer 33 (AIMP-D)	1 July 1966	(United States) NASA	Delta E1	Explorer 33	Orbiter	Partial failure
41	Explorer 33 (AIMP-D)	Magnetospheric probe; rocket imparted greater velocity than had been planned, leaving spacecraft unable to enter orbit. Repurposed for Earth orbit mission which was completed successfully.					
42	Lunar Orbiter 1	10 August 1966	(United States) NASA	Atlas SLV-3 Agena-D	Lunar Orbiter 1	Orbiter	Partial failure
42	Lunar Orbiter 1	Orbital insertion at around 15:36 UTC on 14 August. Deorbited early due to lack of fuel and to avoid communications interference with the next mission, impacted the Moon at 13:30 UTC on 29 October 1966.					
43	Luna 11 (E-6LF No.101)	21 August 1966	(Soviet Union) Lavochkin	Molniya-M	Luna 11	Orbiter	Partial failure
43	Luna 11 (E-6LF No.101)	Entered orbit on 28 August 1966. Failed to return images; other instruments operated correctly. Conducted gamma ray and X-ray observations to study the composition of the Moon, investigated the lunar gravitational field, the presence of meteorites in the lunar environment and the radiation environment at the Moon. Ceased operation on 1 October 1966 after power was depleted.					
44	Surveyor 2	20 September 1966	(United States) NASA	Atlas LV-3C Centaur-D	Surveyor 2	Lander	Spacecraft failure
44	Surveyor 2	One thruster failed to ignite during mid-course correction manoeuvre, resulting in loss of control. Impacted the Moon at 03:18 UTC on 23 September 1966.					
45	Luna 12 (E-6LF No.102)	22 October 1966	(Soviet Union) Lavochkin	Molniya-M	Luna 12	Orbiter	Success
45	Luna 12 (E-6LF No.102)	Entered orbit on 25 October 1966 and returned data until 19 January 1967. Completed photography mission intended for Luna 11.					
46	Lunar Orbiter 2	6 November 1966	(United States) NASA	Atlas SLV-3 Agena-D	Lunar Orbiter 2	Orbiter	Success
46	Lunar Orbiter 2	Entered orbit at about 19:51 UTC on 10 November 1966 to begin photographic mapping mission. Impacted on the far side of the lunar surface following deorbit burn on 11 October 1967 at end of mission.					
47	Luna 13 (E-6M No.205)	21 December 1966	(Soviet Union) Lavochkin	Molniya-M	Luna 13	Lander	Success
47	Luna 13 (E-6M No.205)	Successfully landed in Oceanus Procellarum at 18:01 UTC on 24 December 1966. Returned images from the surface and studied the lunar soil. Operated until depletion of power at 06:31 UTC on 28 December.					
48	Lunar Orbiter 3	5 February 1967	(United States) NASA	Atlas SLV-3 Agena-D	Lunar Orbiter 3	Orbiter	Success
48	Lunar Orbiter 3	Entered orbit at 21:54 UTC on 8 February 1967. Deorbited at end of mission and impacted the Moon on 9 October 1967.					
49	Surveyor 3	17 April 1967	(United States) NASA	Atlas LV-3C Centaur-D	Surveyor 3	Lander	Success
49	Surveyor 3	Landed at 00:04 UTC on 20 April 1967 and operated until 3 May. Visited by Apollo 12 astronauts in 1969, with some parts removed for return to Earth.					
50	Lunar Orbiter 4	4 May 1967	(United States) NASA	Atlas SLV-3 Agena-D	Lunar Orbiter 4	Orbiter	Success
50	Lunar Orbiter 4	Entered orbit at 21:54 UTC on 8 May 1967, operated until 17 July. Decayed from orbit, with lunar impact occurring on 6 October 1967.					
51	Surveyor 4	14 July 1967	(United States) NASA	Atlas LV-3C Centaur-D	Surveyor 4	Lander	Spacecraft failure
51	Surveyor 4	Contact with spacecraft lost at 02:03 UTC on 17 July, two and a half minutes before scheduled landing. NASA determined that the spacecraft may have exploded, otherwise it impacted the Moon.					
52	Explorer 35 (AIMP-E)	19 July 1967	(United States) NASA	Delta E1	Explorer 35 (AIMP-E)	Orbiter	Success
52	Explorer 35 (AIMP-E)	Magnetospheric probe, studying the Moon and interplanetary space. Deactivated on 27 June 1973. Presumed to have impacted the Moon during the 1970s.					
53	Lunar Orbiter 5	1 August 1967	(United States) NASA	Atlas SLV-3 Agena-D	Lunar Orbiter 5	Orbiter	Success
53	Lunar Orbiter 5	Final mission in the Lunar Orbiter series, entered selenocentric orbit on 5 August at 16:48 UTC and conducted a photographic survey until 18 August. Deorbited and impacted the Moon on 31 January 1968.					
54	Surveyor 5	8 September 1967	(United States) NASA	Atlas SLV-3C Centaur-D	Surveyor 5	Lander	Success
54	Surveyor 5	Landed in Mare Tranquillitatis at 00:46:44 UTC on 11 September. Last signals received at 04:30 UTC on 17 December 1967.					
55	Soyuz 7K-L1 No.4L	27 September 1967	(Soviet Union) Lavochkin	Proton-K/D	Soyuz 7K-L1 No.4L	Flyby	Spacecraft failure
55	Soyuz 7K-L1 No.4L	Technology demonstration for planned crewed missions. Failed to reach orbit after a blocked propellant line caused one of the first-stage engines to not ignite.					
56	Surveyor 6	7 November 1967	(United States) NASA	Atlas SLV-3C Centaur-D	Surveyor 6	Lander	Success
56	Surveyor 6	Landed in Sinus Medii at 01:01:04 UTC on 10 November. Made brief flight from lunar surface at 10:32 UTC on 17 November, followed by second landing after travelling 2.4 metres (7 ft 10 in). Last contact at 19:14 UTC on 14 December.					
57	Soyuz 7K-L1 No.5L	22 November 1967	(Soviet Union) Lavochkin	Proton-K/D	Soyuz 7K-L1 No.5L	Flyby	Launch failure
57	Soyuz 7K-L1 No.5L	Technology demonstration for planned crewed missions; unable to achieve orbit after second-stage engine failed to ignite.					
58	Surveyor 7	7 January 1968	(United States) NASA	Atlas SLV-3C Centaur-D	Surveyor 7	Lander	Success
58	Surveyor 7	Final Surveyor mission. Landed 29 kilometres (18 mi) from Tycho crater at 01:05:36 UTC on 10 January. Operated until 21 February 1968.					
59	Luna E-6LS No.112	7 February 1968	(Soviet Union) Lavochkin	Molniya-M	Luna E-6LS No.112	Orbiter	Launch failure
59	Luna E-6LS No.112	Failed to orbit after third stage ran out of fuel.					
60	Luna 14 (E-6LS No.113)	7 April 1968	(Soviet Union) Lavochkin	Molniya-M	Luna 14	Orbiter	Success
60	Luna 14 (E-6LS No.113)	Tested communications for proposed crewed missions and studied the mass concentration of the Moon. Entered orbit on 10 April at 19:25 UTC.					
61	Soyuz 7K-L1 No.7L	22 April 1968	(Soviet Union) Lavochkin	Proton-K/D	Soyuz 7K-L1 No.7L	Flyby	Launch failure
61	Soyuz 7K-L1 No.7L	Technology demonstration for planned crewed missions. Failed to orbit after second-stage engine incorrectly commanded to shut down. Spacecraft was recovered using its prototype launch escape system.					
62	Zond 5 (7K-L1 No.9L)	14 September 1968	(Soviet Union) Lavochkin	Proton-K/D	Zond 5	Flyby	Success
62	Zond 5 (7K-L1 No.9L)	Two tortoises and other life forms on board a technology demonstration for planned crewed missions. Made a closest approach of 1,950 kilometres (1,210 mi) on 18 September, and circled the Moon before returning to Earth. Landed in the Indian Ocean on 21 September at 16:08 UTC, becoming the first Lunar spacecraft to be recovered successfully and carried the first Earth life to travel to and around the Moon.					
63	Zond 6 (7K-L1 No.12L)	10 November 1968	(Soviet Union) Lavochkin	Proton-K/D	Zond 6	Flyby	Spacecraft failure
63	Zond 6 (7K-L1 No.12L)	Technology demonstration for planned crewed missions. Carrying turtles, making this the second mission of Earthlings to travel in close proximity of the Moon, the flyby was on 14 November with a closest approach of 2,420 kilometres (1,500 mi). Reentered Earth's atmosphere on 17 November; recovery was unsuccessful after parachutes were prematurely jettisoned.					
64	Apollo 8	21 December 1968	(United States) NASA	Saturn V	Apollo 8	Crewed orbiter	Success
64	Apollo 8	First crewed mission to the Moon; entered orbit around the Moon with four-minute burn beginning at 09:59:52 UTC on 24 December. Completed ten orbits of the Moon and presented a reading from the Book of Genesis before returning to Earth with an engine burn at 06:10:16 UTC on 25 December. Landed in the Pacific Ocean at 15:51 UTC on 27 December.					
65	Soyuz 7K-L1 No.13L	20 January 1969	(Soviet Union) Lavochkin	Proton-K/D	Soyuz 7K-L1 No.13L	Flyby	Launch failure
65	Soyuz 7K-L1 No.13L	Technology demonstration for planned crewed missions. Failed to orbit after one of the four second-stage engines shut down prematurely. Third-stage engine also shut down prematurely. The spacecraft was recovered using its launch escape system.					
66	Luna E-8 No.201	19 February 1969	(Soviet Union) Lavochkin	Proton-K/D	Luna E-8 No.201	Lander	Launch failure
66	Luna E-8 No.201	19 February 1969	(Soviet Union) Lavochkin	Proton-K/D	Lunokhod	Rover	Launch failure
66	Luna E-8 No.201	First launch of the Lunokhod rover. Launch vehicle disintegrated 51 seconds after launch and exploded.					
67	Soyuz 7K-L1S No.3	21 February 1969	(Soviet Union) OKB-1	N1	Soyuz 7K-L1S No.3	Orbiter	Launch failure
67	Soyuz 7K-L1S No.3	First launch of N1 rocket; intended to orbit the Moon and return to Earth. First stage prematurely shut down 70 seconds after launch; launch vehicle crashed 50 kilometres (31 mi) from launch site. Spacecraft landed some 35 kilometres (22 mi) from the launch pad after successfully using its launch escape system.					
68	Apollo 10	18 May 1969	(United States) NASA	Saturn V	Apollo 10	Orbiter	Success
68	Apollo 10	18 May 1969	(United States) NASA	Saturn V	Lunar Module Snoopy	Orbiter	Success
68	Apollo 10	Dress rehearsal for Apollo 11. Lunar Module with two astronauts on board descended to a distance of 14.326 kilometres (8.902 mi) above the lunar surface.					
69	Luna E-8-5 No.402	14 June 1969	(Soviet Union) Lavochkin	Proton-K/D	Luna E-8-5 No.402	Lander	Launch failure
69	Luna E-8-5 No.402	14 June 1969	(Soviet Union) Lavochkin	Proton-K/D	Luna E-8-5 No.402 return craft	Sample Return	Launch failure
69	Luna E-8-5 No.402	Intended to land on the Moon and return lunar soil sample. Did not reach Earth orbit after fourth stage failed to ignite.					
70	Soyuz 7K-L1S No.5	3 July 1969	(Soviet Union) OKB-1	N1	Soyuz 7K-L1S No.5	Orbiter	Launch failure
70	Soyuz 7K-L1S No.5	Intended to orbit the Moon and return to Earth. All first-stage engines shut down 10 seconds after launch; launch vehicle crashed and exploded on the launch pad. Spacecraft landed safely 2 kilometres (1.2 mi) from the launch site after using launch escape sequence.					
71	Luna 15 (E-8-5 No.401)	13 July 1969	(Soviet Union) Lavochkin	Proton-K/D	Luna 15	Lander	Spacecraft failure
71	Luna 15 (E-8-5 No.401)	13 July 1969	(Soviet Union) Lavochkin	Proton-K/D	Luna 15 return craft	Sample Return	Precluded
71	Luna 15 (E-8-5 No.401)	Reached lunar orbit at 10:00 UTC on 17 July. Descent retro-rocket burn started at 15:47 UTC on 21 July. Contact lost three minutes after de-orbit burn; probably crashed on the Moon.					
72	Apollo 11	16 July 1969	(United States) NASA	Saturn V	Apollo 11	Orbiter	Success
72	Apollo 11	16 July 1969	(United States) NASA	Saturn V	Lunar Module Eagle	Lander/Launch Vehicle	Success
72	Apollo 11	First crewed landing on the Moon. The Lunar Module Eagle landed at 20:17 UTC on 20 July 1969.					
73	Zond 7 (7K-L1 No.11L)	7 August 1969	(Soviet Union) Lavochkin	Proton-K/D	Zond 7	Flyby	Success
73	Zond 7 (7K-L1 No.11L)	Technology demonstration for planned crewed missions. Carried four turtles in a lunar flyby on 10 August, with a closest approach of 1,200 kilometres (750 mi); returned to Earth and landed in Kazakhstan at 18:13 UTC on 14 August.					
74	Kosmos 300 (E-8-5 No.403)	23 September 1969	(Soviet Union) Lavochkin	Proton-K/D	Kosmos 300	Lander	Launch failure
74	Kosmos 300 (E-8-5 No.403)	23 September 1969	(Soviet Union) Lavochkin	Proton-K/D	Kosmos 300 return craft	Sample return	Launch failure
74	Kosmos 300 (E-8-5 No.403)	Third attempt at lunar sample return. After reaching low Earth orbit, the fourth-stage engine failed to fire for trans-lunar injection due to oxidizer leak. Spacecraft re-entered Earth's atmosphere about 4 days after launch.					
75	Kosmos 305 (E-8-5 No.404)	22 October 1969	(Soviet Union) Lavochkin	Proton-K/D	Kosmos 305	Lander	Launch failure
75	Kosmos 305 (E-8-5 No.404)	22 October 1969	(Soviet Union) Lavochkin	Proton-K/D	Kosmos 305 return craft	Sample Return	Launch failure
75	Kosmos 305 (E-8-5 No.404)	Fourth attempt at lunar sample return. After reaching low Earth orbit, the fourth-stage engine failed to fire for trans-lunar injection due to control system malfunction. Spacecraft re-entered Earth's atmosphere within one orbit after launch.					
76	Apollo 12	14 November 1969	(United States) NASA	Saturn V	Apollo 12	Orbiter	Success
76	Apollo 12	14 November 1969	(United States) NASA	Saturn V	Lunar Module Intrepid	Lander/Launch Vehicle	Success
76	Apollo 12	Second crewed lunar landing.					
77	Luna E-8-5 No.405	6 February 1970	(Soviet Union) Lavochkin	Proton-K/D	Luna E-8-5 No.405	Lander	Launch failure
77	Luna E-8-5 No.405	6 February 1970	(Soviet Union) Lavochkin	Proton-K/D	Luna E-8-5 No.405 return craft	Sample return	Launch failure
77	Luna E-8-5 No.405	Failed to orbit					
78	Apollo 13	11 April 1970	(United States) NASA	Saturn V	Apollo 13	Orbiter	Spacecraft failure
78	Apollo 13	11 April 1970	(United States) NASA	Saturn V	Lunar Module Aquarius	Lander/Launch Vehicle	Precluded
78	Apollo 13	11 April 1970	(United States) NASA	Saturn V	Lunar Module Aquarius	Rescue mission	Success
78	Apollo 13	Lunar landing aborted following Service Module oxygen tank explosion en route to the Moon; flew past the Moon (free-return trajectory) and returned the crew safely to Earth.					
79	Luna 16 (E-8-5 No.406)	12 September 1970	(Soviet Union) Lavochkin	Proton-K/D	Luna 16	Lander	Success
79	Luna 16 (E-8-5 No.406)	12 September 1970	(Soviet Union) Lavochkin	Proton-K/D	Luna 16 return craft	Sample return	Success
79	Luna 16 (E-8-5 No.406)	First robotic sampling mission.					
80	Zond 8 (7K-L1 No.14L)	20 October 1970	(Soviet Union) Lavochkin	Proton-K/D	Zond 8	Flyby	Success
80	Zond 8 (7K-L1 No.14L)	Technology demonstration for planned crewed missions; returned to Earth successfully.					
81	Luna 17 (E-8 No.203)	10 November 1970	(Soviet Union) Lavochkin	Proton-K/D	Luna 17	Lander	Success
81	Luna 17 (E-8 No.203)	10 November 1970	(Soviet Union) Lavochkin	Proton-K/D	Lunokhod 1	Rover	Success
81	Luna 17 (E-8 No.203)	Luna 17 deployed Lunokhod 1.					
82	Apollo 14	31 January 1971	(United States) NASA	Saturn V	Apollo 14	Orbiter	Success
82	Apollo 14	31 January 1971	(United States) NASA	Saturn V	Lunar Module Antares	Lander/Launch Vehicle	Success
82	Apollo 14	Third crewed lunar landing.					
83	Apollo 15	26 July 1971	(United States) NASA	Saturn V	Apollo 15	Orbiter	Success
83	Apollo 15	26 July 1971	(United States) NASA	Saturn V	Lunar Module Falcon	Lander/Launch Vehicle	Success
83	Apollo 15	26 July 1971	(United States) NASA	Saturn V	Lunar Roving Vehicle	Rover	Success
83	Apollo 15	Fourth crewed lunar landing, and first to use the Lunar Roving Vehicle.					
84	PFS-1	26 July 1971	(United States) NASA	Saturn V	PFS-1	Orbiter	Success
84	PFS-1	PFS-1 was deployed from Apollo 15.					
85	Luna 18 (E-8-5 No.407)	2 September 1971	(Soviet Union) Lavochkin	Proton-K/D	Luna 18	Lander	Spacecraft failure
85	Luna 18 (E-8-5 No.407)	2 September 1971	(Soviet Union) Lavochkin	Proton-K/D	Luna 18 return craft	Sample return	Spacecraft failure
85	Luna 18 (E-8-5 No.407)	Failed during descent to lunar surface.					
86	Luna 19 (E-8LS No.202)	28 September 1971	(Soviet Union) Lavochkin	Proton-K/D	Luna 19	Orbiter	Success
86	Luna 19 (E-8LS No.202)	Entered an orbit around the Moon on 2 October 1971 after two midcourse corrections on 29 September and 1 October.					
87	Luna 20 (E-8-5 No.408)	14 February 1972	(Soviet Union) Lavochkin	Proton-K/D	Luna 20	Lander	Success
87	Luna 20 (E-8-5 No.408)	14 February 1972	(Soviet Union) Lavochkin	Proton-K/D	Luna 20 return craft	Sample return	Success
87	Luna 20 (E-8-5 No.408)	Luna 20 soft landed on the Moon in a mountainous area known as the Terra Apollonius (or Apollonius highlands) near Mare Fecunditatis (Sea of Fertility), 120 km from where Luna 16 had landed.					
88	Apollo 16	16 April 1972	(United States) NASA	Saturn V	Apollo 16	Orbiter	Success
88	Apollo 16	16 April 1972	(United States) NASA	Saturn V	Lunar Module Orion	Lander/Launch Vehicle	Success
88	Apollo 16	16 April 1972	(United States) NASA	Saturn V	Lunar Roving Vehicle	Rover	Success
88	Apollo 16	5th crewed lunar landing.					
89	PFS-2	16 April 1972	(United States) NASA	Saturn V	PFS-2	Orbiter	Success
89	PFS-2	PFS-2 deployed from Apollo 16.					
90	Soyuz 7K-LOK No.1	23 November 1972	(Soviet Union) OKB-1	N1	Soyuz 7K-LOK No.1	Orbiter	Launch failure
90	Soyuz 7K-LOK No.1	Failed to orbit; intended to orbit the Moon and return to Earth.					
91	Apollo 17	7 December 1972	(United States) NASA	Saturn V	Apollo 17	Orbiter	Success
91	Apollo 17	7 December 1972	(United States) NASA	Saturn V	Lunar Module Challenger	Lander/Launch Vehicle	Success
91	Apollo 17	7 December 1972	(United States) NASA	Saturn V	Lunar Roving Vehicle	Rover	Success
91	Apollo 17	Sixth and last crewed Apollo lunar landing and last use of the Lunar Roving Vehicle; the orbiting command module included five mice.					
92	Luna 21 (E-8 No.204)	8 January 1973	(Soviet Union) Lavochkin	Proton-K/D	Luna 21	Lander	Success
92	Luna 21 (E-8 No.204)	8 January 1973	(Soviet Union) Lavochkin	Proton-K/D	Lunokhod 2	Rover	Success
92	Luna 21 (E-8 No.204)	Deployed Lunokhod 2.					
93	Explorer 49 (RAE-B)	10 June 1973	(United States) NASA	Delta 1913	Explorer 49	Orbiter	Success
93	Explorer 49 (RAE-B)	Radio astronomy spacecraft, operated in selenocentric orbit to avoid interference from terrestrial radio sources.					
94	Mariner 10	3 November 1973	(United States) NASA	Atlas SLV-3D Centaur-D1A	Mariner 10	Flyby	Success
94	Mariner 10	Interplanetary spacecraft, mapped lunar north pole to test cameras.					
95	Luna 22 (E-8LS No.206)	29 May 1974	(Soviet Union) Lavochkin	Proton-K/D	Luna 22	Orbiter	Success
95	Luna 22 (E-8LS No.206)	Inserted into a circular lunar orbit on 2 June 1974					
96	Luna 23 (E-8-5M No.410)	28 October 1974	(Soviet Union) Lavochkin	Proton-K/D	Luna 23	Lander	Partial failure
96	Luna 23 (E-8-5M No.410)	28 October 1974	(Soviet Union) Lavochkin	Proton-K/D	Luna 23 return craft	Sample Return	Precluded
96	Luna 23 (E-8-5M No.410)	Tipped over upon landing, precluding any sample return attempt. Functioned for three days on surface.					
97	Luna E-8-5M No.412	16 October 1975	(Soviet Union) Lavochkin	Proton-K/D	Luna E-8-5M No.412	Lander	Launch failure
97	Luna E-8-5M No.412	16 October 1975	(Soviet Union) Lavochkin	Proton-K/D	Luna E-8-5M No.412 return craft	Sample Return	Launch failure
97	Luna E-8-5M No.412	Failed to orbit.					
98	Luna 24 (E-8-5M No.413)	9 August 1976	(Soviet Union) Lavochkin	Proton-K/D	Luna 24	Lander	Success
98	Luna 24 (E-8-5M No.413)	9 August 1976	(Soviet Union) Lavochkin	Proton-K/D	Luna 24 return craft	Sample Return	Success
98	Luna 24 (E-8-5M No.413)	Entered orbit on 11 August 1976 and landed in Mare Crisium at 16:36 UTC on 18 August. Sample capsule launched at 05:25 UTC on 19 August and recovered 96 1/2 hours later. Returned 170.1 grams (6.00 oz) of lunar regolith. Final mission to the Moon from the Soviet Union.					
99	ISEE-3 (ICE/Explorer 59)	12 August 1978	(United States) NASA	Delta 2914	ISEE-3	Flyby	Success
99	ISEE-3 (ICE/Explorer 59)	Five flybys in 1982 and 1983 en route to comet 21P/Giacobini–Zinner.					
100	Hiten (MUSES-A)	24 January 1990	(Japan) ISAS	Mu-3S-II	Hiten	Orbiter	Success
100	Hiten (MUSES-A)	24 January 1990	(Japan) ISAS	Mu-3S-II	Hagoromo	Orbiter	Spacecraft failure
100	Hiten (MUSES-A)	Designed for flyby, placed into selenocentric orbit during extended mission after failure of Hagoromo. Deorbited and impacted in USGS quadrangle LQ27 on 10 April 1993. Hagoromo was deployed from Hiten. The impact made Japan the 3rd country to impact the surface of the Moon.					
101	Geotail	24 July 1992	(Japan) (United States) ISAS/NASA	Delta II 6925	Geotail	Flyby	Success
101	Geotail	Series of flybys to regulate high Earth orbit.					
102	WIND	1 November 1994	(United States) NASA	Delta II 7925-10	WIND	Flyby	Success
102	WIND	Made two flybys on 1 December 1994 and 27 December 1994 to reach the Earth–Sun L1 Lagrangian point.					
103	Clementine (DSPSE)	25 January 1994	(United States) USAF/NASA	Titan II (23)G Star-37FM	Clementine	Orbiter	Success
103	Clementine (DSPSE)	Completed Lunar objectives successfully; failed following departure from selenocentric orbit.					
104	HGS-1	24 December 1997	(United States) Hughes	Proton-K/DM3	HGS-1	Flyby	Success
104	HGS-1	Communications satellite; made two flybys in May and June 1998 en route to geosynchronous orbit after delivery into wrong orbit.					
105	Lunar Prospector (Discovery 3)	7 January 1998	(United States) NASA	Athena II	Lunar Prospector	Orbiter	Success
105	Lunar Prospector (Discovery 3)	The mission ended on July 31, 1999					
106	Nozomi (PLANET-B)	3 July 1998	(Japan) ISAS	M-V	Nozomi	Flyby	Success
106	Nozomi (PLANET-B)	Two flybys en route to Mars.					

== 21st century ==
Legend

⚀ Cubesat or similar

Mission		Launch date	Operator	Carrier rocket	Spacecraft	Mission type	Outcome
107	WMAP	30 June 2001	(United States) NASA	Delta II 7425-10	WMAP	Flyby	Success
107	WMAP	Flyby on 30 July 2001 to reach the Earth–Sun L2 Lagrangian point.					
108	SMART-1	27 September 2003	ESA	Ariane 5G	SMART-1	Orbiter	Success
108	SMART-1	Impacted Moon in USGS quadrangle LQ26 at end of mission on 3 September 2006. The impact made the ESA member states collectively the 4th to impact the surface of the Moon.					
109	STEREO	25 October 2006	(United States) NASA	Delta II 7925-10L	STEREO A	Flyby	Success
109	STEREO	25 October 2006	(United States) NASA	Delta II 7925-10L	STEREO B	Flyby	Success
109	STEREO	Both component spacecraft entered heliocentric orbit on 15 December 2006.					
110	ARTEMIS	17 February 2007	(United States) NASA	Delta II 7925	ARTEMIS P1	Orbiter	Operational
110	ARTEMIS	17 February 2007	(United States) NASA	Delta II 7925	ARTEMIS P2	Orbiter	Operational
110	ARTEMIS	Two THEMIS spacecraft moved to selenocentric orbit for extended mission; entered orbit July 2011.					
111	SELENE	14 September 2007	(Japan) JAXA	H-IIA 2022	Kaguya	Orbiter	Success
111	SELENE	14 September 2007	(Japan) JAXA	H-IIA 2022	Okina	Orbiter	Success
111	SELENE	14 September 2007	(Japan) JAXA	H-IIA 2022	Ouna	Orbiter	Success
111	SELENE	Deployed Okina and Ouna satellites. Kaguya and Okina impacted the Moon at end of mission. Ouna completed operations on 29 June 2009 but remains in selenocentric orbit.					
112	Chang'e 1	24 October 2007	(China) CNSA	Long March 3A	Chang'e 1	Orbiter	Success
112	Chang'e 1	Impacted Moon in USGS quadrangle LQ21 on 1 March 2009, at end of mission. The impact made China the 5th country and 6th as an agency to impact the surface of the Moon.					
113	Chandrayaan-1	22 October 2008	(India) ISRO	PSLV-XL C11	Chandrayaan-1	Orbiter	Success
113	Chandrayaan-1	22 October 2008	(India) ISRO	PSLV-XL C11	Moon Impact Probe	Impactor	Success
113	Chandrayaan-1	Succeeded through mission. Orbit lasted 312 days, short of intended 2 years; However mission achieved most of its intended objectives. Terminated in 2009, remains in selenocentric orbit; discovered water ice on the Moon. Moon Impact Probe was deployed from the orbiter. It successfully impacted Moon's Shackleton Crater in the USGS quadrangle LQ30 at 20:31 on 14 November 2008 releasing underground debris that could be analysed by the orbiter for presence of water/ice. With this mission, India became the 4th nation to impact the lunar surface and 5th as an agency.					
114	LRO & LCROSS	18 June 2009	(United States) NASA	Atlas V 401	Lunar Reconnaissance Orbiter	Orbiter	Operational
114	LRO & LCROSS	18 June 2009	(United States) NASA	Atlas V 401	LCROSS	Impactor	Success
114	LRO & LCROSS	LCROSS observed impact of Centaur upper stage that launched it and LRO, then impacted itself. Impacts in USGS quadrangle LQ30. LRO entered orbit on June 23, 2009.					
115	Chang'e 2	1 October 2010	(China) CNSA	Long March 3C	Chang'e 2	Orbiter	Success
115	Chang'e 2	Following completion of six month Lunar mission, departed selenocentric orbit for Earth–Sun L2 Lagrangian point and subsequently flew by asteroid 4179 Toutatis for a close encounter with the asteroid at a distance of 3.2 kilometres and a relative velocity of 10.73 km/s.					
116	GRAIL	10 September 2011	(United States) NASA	Delta II 7920H	Ebb (GRAIL-A)	Orbiter	Success
116	GRAIL	10 September 2011	(United States) NASA	Delta II 7920H	Flow (GRAIL-B)	Orbiter	Success
116	GRAIL	Impacted the Moon in USGS quadrangle LQ01 on 17 December 2012 at end of mission.					
117	LADEE	7 September 2013	(United States) NASA	Minotaur V	LADEE	Orbiter	Success
117	LADEE	Mission ended on 18 April 2014, when the spacecraft's controllers intentionally crashed LADEE into the far side of the Moon.					
118	Chang'e 3	1 December 2013	(China) CNSA	Long March 3B	Chang'e 3	Lander	Operational
118	Chang'e 3	1 December 2013	(China) CNSA	Long March 3B	Yutu	Rover	Success
118	Chang'e 3	Entered orbit on 6 December 2013 with landing at 13:12 UTC on 14 December. Yutu rover was deployed from Chang'e 3. With its soft landing, China became the third country to successfully land on the lunar surface.					
119	Chang'e 5-T1	23 October 2014	(China) CNSA	Long March 3C	Chang'e 5-T1	Orbiter	Operational
119	Chang'e 5-T1	23 October 2014	(China) CNSA	Long March 3C	Chang'e 5-T1 Return Capsule	Orbiter	Success
119	Chang'e 5-T1	23 October 2014	(Luxembourg) LuxSpace	Long March 3C	Manfred Memorial Moon Mission	Flyby / Impactor (post mission)	Success
119	Chang'e 5-T1	Demonstration of re-entry capsule for Chang'e 5 sample-return mission at lunar return velocity. Orbiter may still be in lunar orbit. Manfred Memorial Moon Mission attached to third stage of CZ-3C used to launch Chang'e 5-T1. Impacted the Moon on 4 March 2022. The impact made Luxembourg the 7th country to impact the surface of the Moon.					
120	TESS	18 April 2018	(United States) NASA	Falcon 9 Full Thrust	TESS	Flyby	Success
120	TESS	Flyby on 17 May 2018 to designated high Earth orbit.					
121	Queqiao	21 May 2018	(China) CNSA	Long March 4C	Queqiao relay satellite	Relay Satellite	Operational
121	Queqiao	21 May 2018	(China) CNSA	Long March 4C	Longjiang-1	Orbiter	Spacecraft failure
121	Queqiao	21 May 2018	(China) CNSA	Long March 4C	Longjiang-2	Orbiter	Success
121	Queqiao	Launched on the same rocket as Queqiao. Longjiang-1 never entered Moon orbit, while Longjiang-2 operated in lunar orbit until 31 July 2019, when it impacted the lunar surface. Queqiao entered designated Earth–Moon L_{2} orbit on 14 June in preparation of Chang'e 4 far-side lunar lander in December 2018.					
122	Chang'e 4	7 December 2018	(China) CNSA	Long March 3B	Chang'e 4	Lander	Operational
122	Chang'e 4	7 December 2018	(China) CNSA	Long March 3B	Yutu-2	Rover	Operational
122	Chang'e 4	First spacecraft to soft land on the far side of the Moon (South Pole–Aitken basin). Landed 3 January 2019 and deployed the Yutu-2 rover. Cottonseeds sprouted in the lander in a biological experiment, the first plants to sprout on the Moon.					
123	Beresheet	22 February 2019	(Israel) SpaceIL	Falcon 9	Beresheet	Lander	Spacecraft failure
123	Beresheet	First Israeli and first privately funded lunar lander mission. Technology demonstration. Instrumentation included a magnetometer and laser retroreflector. Spacecraft crashed into the lunar surface after main engine failure during descent from lunar orbit phase. The impact made Israel the 8th country to impact the surface of the Moon.					
124	Chandrayaan-2	22 July 2019	(India) ISRO	LVM3	Chandrayaan-2 Orbiter	Orbiter	Operational
124	Chandrayaan-2	22 July 2019	(India) ISRO	LVM3	Vikram	Lander	Spacecraft failure
124	Chandrayaan-2	22 July 2019	(India) ISRO	LVM3	Pragyan	Rover	Precluded
124	Chandrayaan-2	Entered orbit on 20 August 2019. Lander separated from orbiter but crashed during a landing attempt on 6 September 2019, attributed to a software glitch. Both lander and rover were lost. Orbiter remained operational.					
125	Chang'e 5	23 November 2020	(China) CNSA	Long March 5	Chang'e 5 Orbiter	Orbiter	Operational
125	Chang'e 5	23 November 2020	(China) CNSA	Long March 5	Chang'e 5 Lander	Lander	Success
125	Chang'e 5	23 November 2020	(China) CNSA	Long March 5	Chang'e 5 Ascender	Launch Vehicle	Success
125	Chang'e 5	23 November 2020	(China) CNSA	Long March 5	Chang'e 5 Returner	Sample Return	Success
125	Chang'e 5	First lunar sample return mission from China, which returned 1.731 kg (61.1 oz) of lunar samples on 16 December 2020. The orbiter received a mission extension and is currently in a distant retrograde orbit (DRO) of the Moon.					
126	CAPSTONE	28 June 2022	(United States) NASA	Electron	⚀ CAPSTONE	Orbiter	Operational
126	CAPSTONE	Lunar orbiting CubeSat that will test and verify the calculated orbital stability planned for the Gateway space station.					
127	Danuri	4 August 2022	(South Korea) KARI	Falcon 9	Danuri	Orbiter	Operational
127	Danuri	Lunar Orbiter by the Korea Aerospace Research Institute (KARI) of South Korea. The orbiter, its science payload and ground control infrastructure are technology demonstrators. The orbiter will also be tasked with surveying lunar resources such as water ice, uranium, helium-3, silicon, and aluminium, and produce a topographic map to help select future lunar landing sites.					
128	Artemis I	16 November 2022	(United States) NASA	SLS Block 1	Artemis I Orion MPCV CM-002	Orbiter	Success
128	Artemis I	16 November 2022	(United States) NASA	SLS Block 1	⚀ LunaH-Map	Orbiter	Spacecraft failure
128	Artemis I	16 November 2022	(United States) NASA	SLS Block 1	⚀ Lunar IceCube	Orbiter	Spacecraft failure
128	Artemis I	16 November 2022	(United States) NASA	SLS Block 1	⚀ CubeSat for Solar Particles	Flyby	Spacecraft failure
128	Artemis I	16 November 2022	(United States) NASA	SLS Block 1	⚀ Near-Earth Asteroid Scout	Flyby	Spacecraft failure
128	Artemis I	16 November 2022	(United States) NASA	SLS Block 1	⚀ BioSentinel	Flyby	Success
128	Artemis I	16 November 2022	(Japan) JAXA	SLS Block 1	⚀ OMOTENASHI	Lander	Spacecraft failure
128	Artemis I	16 November 2022	(Italy) ASI	SLS Block 1	⚀ ArgoMoon	Flybys	Success
128	Artemis I	16 November 2022	(Japan) JAXA	SLS Block 1	⚀ EQUULEUS	Flybys	Success
128	Artemis I	16 November 2022	(United States) Lockheed Martin	SLS Block 1	⚀ LunIR	Flyby	Spacecraft failure
128	Artemis I	16 November 2022	(United States) Fluid & Reason	SLS Block 1	⚀ Team Miles	Flyby	Success
128	Artemis I	Uncrewed test of Orion spacecraft in lunar flyby and lunar Distant retrograde orbit.					
129	Hakuto-R Mission 1	11 December 2022	(Japan) ispace	Falcon 9 Block 5	Hakuto-R	Lander	Spacecraft failure
129	Hakuto-R Mission 1	11 December 2022	(Japan) Tomy/JAXA/Dodai	Falcon 9 Block 5	SORA-Q	Rover	Precluded
129	Hakuto-R Mission 1	11 December 2022	(United Arab Emirates) UAESA/MBRSC	Falcon 9 Block 5	Rashid	Rover	Precluded
129	Hakuto-R Mission 1	11 December 2022	(United States) NASA	Falcon 9 Block 5	⚀ Lunar Flashlight	Orbiter	Spacecraft failure
129	Hakuto-R Mission 1	Lunar lander technology demonstration. Contact lost during final stage of landing and deemed a failure. Cause of failure determined to be a software bug associated with the altitude estimation system. Emirates Lunar Mission Rashid was a small rover demonstration. The impact made the United Arab Emirates the 9th country to impact the surface of the Moon. Lunar Flashlight initially scheduled to be launched on the Artemis I mission, moved to a Falcon 9 Block 5 after not making it for the payload integration deadline. NASA announced later that it would not make its planned orbit or monthly flybys due to thruster issues.					
130	Jupiter Icy Moons Explorer	14 April 2023	ESA	Ariane 5 ECA	Jupiter Icy Moons Explorer	Flyby	Success
130	Jupiter Icy Moons Explorer	Flew by the Moon on 19 August 2024 en route to Jupiter.					
131	Chandrayaan-3	14 July 2023	(India) ISRO	LVM3	Propulsion Module	Orbiter	Success
131	Chandrayaan-3	14 July 2023	(India) ISRO	LVM3	Vikram	Lander	Success
131	Chandrayaan-3	14 July 2023	(India) ISRO	LVM3	Pragyan	Rover	Success
131	Chandrayaan-3	Launched on 14 July 2023, Orbit insertion on 5 August 2023, Lander separated from propulsion module on 17 August 2023, landed on 23 August 2023, 12:32 UTC and deployed the Pragyan rover. With its soft landing, India became the first country to successfully land near lunar south pole and fourth country to successfully land on the lunar surface. Later during extended operations, the Propulsion Module returned to Earth's orbit.					
132	Luna 25	10 August 2023	(Russia) Roscosmos	Soyuz-2.1b/Fregat	Luna 25	Lander	Spacecraft failure
132	Luna 25	Launched on 10 August 2023, Orbital insertion on 16 August 2023, failed orbital maneuver on 19 August 2023 set the spacecraft on the crash course with the Moon's surface. Loss of communication was confirmed by Roscosmos on 20 August 2023.					
133	SLIM	6 September 2023	(Japan) JAXA	H-IIA	SLIM	Lander	Success
133	SLIM	6 September 2023	(Japan) JAXA	H-IIA	LEV-1	Hopper	Success
133	SLIM	6 September 2023	(Japan) Tomy / JAXA / Doshisha University	H-IIA	LEV-2 (Sora-Q)	Rover	Success
133	SLIM	Launched alongside XRISM as a co-passenger on 7 September 2023. Performed lunar swing-by, followed by lunar orbital insertion on 25 December 2023. SLIM landed intact and within 100 m of its target on 19 January 2024, 15:20 UTC, which met JAXA's criteria for a successful landing. However, it had landed with incorrect attitude to orient solar panels towards the Sun, which led to temporary power loss until the Sun was in the right position. LEV-1 and LEV-2 were successfully deployed and landed separately from SLIM shortly before its own landing. LEV-1 conducted six hops on lunar surface. With its soft landing, Japan became the fifth country to successfully land on the lunar surface.					
134	Peregrine Mission One	8 January 2024	(United States) Astrobotic Technology	Vulcan Centaur VC2	Peregrine	Lander	Spacecraft failure
134	Peregrine Mission One	8 January 2024	(Mexico) UNAM	Vulcan Centaur VC2	Colmena × 5	Rovers	Precluded
134	Peregrine Mission One	8 January 2024	(United States) CMU	Vulcan Centaur VC2	⚀ Iris	Rover	Precluded
134	Peregrine Mission One	Part of CLPS. Peregrine lander's reaction thrusters' leak deemed the spacecraft uncontrollable for landing and it decayed in the Earth's atmosphere 10 days later.					
135	IM-1	14 February 2024	(United States) Intuitive Machines	Falcon 9 B5	Nova-C Odysseus	Lander	Success
135	IM-1	14 February 2024	(United States) ERAU	Falcon 9 B5	⚀ EagleCam	Deployable camera	Spacecraft failure
135	IM-1	First Nova-C mission. First private spacecraft to soft land on the Moon. Payloads successfully delivered for NASA CLPS and for private customers. Though it landed successfully, one of the lander's legs broke upon landing and it tilted up on other side, 18° due to landing on a slope, but the lander survived and payloads are functioning as expected. EagleCam was not ejected prior to landing. It was later ejected on 28 February but minimal data was obtained.					
136	DRO A/B	13 March 2024	(China) CAS	Long March 2C	DRO-A	Relay Satellite	Operational
136	DRO A/B	13 March 2024	(China) CAS	Long March 2C	DRO-B	Relay Satellite	Operational
136	DRO A/B	Yuanzheng 1S upper stage failed to deliver spacecraft into correct orbit. The satellites were intended to test Distant retrograde orbit. Tracking data appears to show China is attempting to salvage spacecraft and they appear to have succeeded in reaching their desired orbit.					
137	Queqiao-2	20 March 2024	(China) CNSA	Long March 8	Queqiao-2	Relay Satellite	Operational
137	Queqiao-2	20 March 2024	(China) Deep Space Exploration Laboratory (DSEL, Tiandu Lab)	Long March 8	Tiandu-1	Orbiter	Operational
137	Queqiao-2	20 March 2024	(China) Deep Space Exploration Laboratory (DSEL, Tiandu Lab)	Long March 8	Tiandu-2	Orbiter	Operational
137	Queqiao-2	Relay satellite to support future missions of the Chinese Lunar Exploration Program targeting south pole region. Tiandu satellites are launched with them to test communications for future lunar satellite constellation technologies.					
138	Chang'e 6	3 May 2024	(China) CNSA	Long March 5	Chang'e 6 Orbiter	Orbiter	Success
138	Chang'e 6	3 May 2024	(China) CNSA	Long March 5	Chang'e 6 Lander	Lander	Success
138	Chang'e 6	3 May 2024	(China) CNSA	Long March 5	Chang'e 6 Ascender	Launch Vehicle	Success
138	Chang'e 6	3 May 2024	(China) CNSA	Long March 5	Chang'e 6 Returner	Sample Return	Success
138	Chang'e 6	3 May 2024	(China) CNSA	Long March 5	Jinchan	Rover	Success
138	Chang'e 6	3 May 2024	(Pakistan) SUPARCO (Note: "Even though the source says "IST will conduct various tests"; IST being a research university does not directly control the orbiter, rather any tests or operations on the orbiter are done through the national space agency i.e SUPARCO.")	Long March 5	⚀ ICUBE-Q	Orbiter	Success
138	Chang'e 6	First spacecraft to have collected lunar samples from the far side of the Moon (Apollo crater, South Pole–Aitken basin). ICUBE-Q is Pakistan's first lunar mission. Lander carries international payloads from ESA, France, Italy, and Sweden. It also carried a mini rover to conduct infrared spectroscopy of lunar surface. The orbiter went to Sun Earth L2 under mission extension.					
139	Blue Ghost M1	15 January 2025	(United States) Firefly Aerospace	Falcon 9 B5	Blue Ghost Lander	Lander	Success
139	Blue Ghost M1	Lunar lander, carrying NASA-sponsored experiments and commercial payloads to Mare Crisium. First fully-successful private lunar landing.					
140	Hakuto-R Mission 2	15 January 2025	(Japan) ispace	Falcon 9 B5	Hakuto-R	Lander	Spacecraft failure
140	Hakuto-R Mission 2	15 January 2025	(Luxembourg) ispace Europe	Falcon 9 B5	Tenacious	Rover	Precluded
140	Hakuto-R Mission 2	Launched on the same rocket as Blue Ghost. On 5 June 2025, the lander failed to complete its landing, impacting the lunar surface.					
141	Lunar Trailblazer	27 February 2025	(United States) NASA	Falcon 9 B5	Lunar Trailblazer	Orbiter	Spacecraft failure
141	Lunar Trailblazer	Lunar orbiter aimed to aid in the understanding of lunar water and the Moon's water cycle. Flyby on 3 March 2025.					
142	Brokkr-2	27 February 2025	(United States) AstroForge	Falcon 9 B5	Brokkr-2	Flyby	Spacecraft failure
142	Brokkr-2	Asteroid probe intended to flyby the near-Earth asteroid 2022 OB5. Communication failure. Flyby on 3 March 2025.					
143	Chimera-1	27 February 2025	(United States) Epic Aerospace	Falcon 9 B5	Chimera-1	Flyby	Success
143	Chimera-1	Space tug planned TLI to Geosynchronous. Communication failure?. Flyby on 3 March 2025.					
144	IM-2	27 February 2025	(United States) Intuitive Machines	Falcon 9 B5	Nova-C	Lander	Partial failure
144	IM-2	27 February 2025	(United States) Intuitive Machines	Falcon 9 B5	μNova	Hopper	Precluded
144	IM-2	27 February 2025	(United States) Lunar Outpost/ (Finland) Nokia	Falcon 9 B5	MAPP	Rover	Precluded
144	IM-2	27 February 2025	(United States) MIT	Falcon 9 B5	AstroAnt	Rover	Precluded
144	IM-2	27 February 2025	(Japan) Dymon	Falcon 9 B5	Yaoki	Rover	Precluded
144	IM-2	Second Nova-C. Payloads delivery for NASA's CLPS and for private customers. MAPP and μNova were to test a new Nokia lunar communication system. Lander achieved a soft landing on 6 March but landed on its side, precluding recharging and deployment of payloads. Mission concluded one day after landing.					
145	Artemis II	1 April 2026	(United States) NASA	SLS Block 1	Orion CM-003	Flyby	Success
145	Artemis II	Crewed test of the Orion spacecraft on a free-return trajectory around the Moon.					

== Statistics ==
=== Launches by decade ===
Launches to Moon
Decade
1950s	13
1960s	63
1970s	23
1980s	0
1990s	7
2000s	8
2010s	10
2020s	21

This is a list of 145 missions (including failed ones) to the Moon. It includes Flybys, Impact probes, orbiters, landers, rovers and crewed missions.

=== Mission milestones by country ===
This is a list of major milestones achieved by country. Recorded is the first spacecraft from each respective country to accomplish each milestone, regardless of mission type or intended outcome. For example, Beresheet was not intended to be an impactor, but achieved that milestone incidentally.

Legend

Attempted Milestone achieved
Attempted Milestone not achieved
† First to achieve
* Done in collaboration with another country

Country/ Agency	Flyby (Note: While Orbiting specific missions achieve a flyby milestone by virtue of entering the orbit, this table lists only flyby specific missions.)	Orbit	Impact	Soft landing	Rover	Sample return	Crewed Orbiting/Flyby	Crewed landing
United States	Pioneer 4, 1959	Lunar Orbiter 1, 1966	Ranger 4, 1962	Surveyor 1, 1966	LRV (Apollo 15), 1971	Apollo 11, 1969 †	Apollo 8, 1968 †	Apollo 11, 1969 †
Soviet Union	Luna 1, 1959 †	Luna 10, 1966 †	Luna 2, 1959 †	Luna 9, 1966 †	Lunokhod 1, 1970 †	Luna 16, 1970	—	—
China	Chang'e 5-T1, 2014	Chang'e 1, 2007	Chang'e 1, 2009	Chang'e 3, 2013	Yutu, 2013	Chang'e 5, 2020	—	—
India	Chandrayaan 3, 2023	Chandrayaan 1, 2008	MIP, 2008	Chandrayaan 3, 2023	Pragyan, 2023	—	—	—
Japan	Hiten, 1990	Hiten, 1993	Hiten, 1993	SLIM, 2024	LEV-1, 2024	—	—	—
Israel	—	Beresheet, 2019	Beresheet, 2019	Beresheet, 2019	—	—	—	—
Russia	—	Luna 25, 2023	Luna 25, 2023	Luna 25, 2023	—	—	—	—
ESA	—	SMART-1, 2003	SMART-1, 2006	—	—	—	—	—
Canada	—	—	—	—	—	—	Artemis II, 2026* (Note: Done in collaboration with the United States.)	—
Luxembourg	4M, 2014	—	4M, 2022	—	—	—	—	—
South Korea	—	Danuri, 2022	—	—	—	—	—	—
Italy	ArgoMoon, 2022	—	—	—	—	—	—	—
(United Arab Emirates) UAE	—	—	Rashid, 2023	—	Rashid, 2023	—	—	—
Pakistan	—	ICUBE-Q, 2024	—	—	—	—	—	—
Mexico	—	—	—	—	Colmena, 2024	—	—	—

=== Missions by organization/company ===
Analysis of numbers of lunar missions
Country/Agency	Agency or company	Successful	Partial failure	Failure	Success rate	Operational	Total	Total for country
(Soviet Union) USSR	Lavochkin	16	2	22	40%	–	40	58
(Soviet Union) USSR	Energia	2	–	16	11.11%	–	18	58
USA	NASA	37	3	13	67.27%	4	55	57
USA	USAF	1	–	1	50%	–	2	57
China	CNSA	10	–	–	100%	8	10	10
Japan	ISAS	2	–	2	50%	–	4	8
Japan	JAXA	2	–	1	66.6%	1	4	8
India	ISRO	2	1	–	66.6%	2	3	3
Various member states	ESA	1	–	–	100%	–	1	1
Luxembourg	LuxSpace	1	–	–	100%	–	1	1
South Korea	KARI	1	–	–	100%	1	1	1
USA (private company)	Lockheed Martin	1	–	–	100%	–	1	1
USA (private company)	Fluid & Reason	1	–	–	100%	–	1	1
USA (private company)	Astrobotic Technology	–	–	1	0%	–	1	1
USA (private company)	Intuitive Machines	1	1	–	50%	–	2	2
USA (private university)	ERAU	–	–	1	0%	–	1	1
USA (private company)	Firefly Aerospace	1	–	–	100%	–	1	1
Italy	ASI	1	–	–	100%	–	1	1
Israel	SpaceIL	–	–	1	0%	–	1	1
Russia	Roscosmos	–	–	1	0%	–	1	1
(United Arab Emirates) UAE	UAESA	–	–	1	0%	–	1	1
Japan (private company)	ispace	–	–	1	0%	–	1	1
Pakistan	IST / SUPARCO	1	–	–	100%	1	1	1
Canada	CSA	1	–	–	100%	-	1	1

=== Landing sites ===
- Clickable map of the locations of all successful soft landings on the near side of the Moon to date (top): Luna program (USSR); Surveyor program (USA); Apollo program (USA); Chang'e program (China); Chandrayaan program (India); SLIM (Japan); Commercial Lunar Payload Services (USA); Dates are landing dates in Coordinated Universal Time. Except for the Apollo program, all soft landings were uncrewed. Asterisk indicates a partial success.

As of March 2025, there have been a total twenty eight successful soft landings on the Moon carried out by five countries that include China, India, Japan, the Soviet Union, and the United States. Among these, a total of six soft landings were crewed (Apollo); all crewed soft landings were conducted by the United States. All two soft landings on the far side of the Moon were carried out by China, while soft landing near the lunar south pole was carried out by India's Chandrayaan-3 and Intuitive Machines' IM-1 Nova-C Odysseus and IM-2 Nova-C Athena lander.

== Future missions ==
There are several future lunar missions planned or proposed by various nations and organizations.

=== Funded and are under development ===
==== Robotic ====
Mission	Spacecraft	Launch date	Carrier rocket	Operator	Mission type
Griffin Mission 1	Griffin lander	January 6, 2027	Falcon Heavy	(United States) Astrobotic Technology	Lander
AYAP-1	AYAP-1	NET April 2027	Falcon 9 B5	(Turkey) Turkish Space Agency	Orbiter
AYAP-1	Planning to impact the Moon at end of mission				
Chang'e 7	Chang'e 7 Orbiter	2027 (TBD)	Long March 5	(China) CNSA	Orbiter
Chang'e 7	Chang'e 7 Lander	2027 (TBD)	Long March 5	(China) CNSA	Lander
Chang'e 7	Chang'e 7 Rover	2027 (TBD)	Long March 5	(China) CNSA	Rover
Chang'e 7	Chang'e 7 Hopper	2027 (TBD)	Long March 5	(China) CNSA	Hopper
Chang'e 7	Payloads include an orbiter, south pole lander, rover, and a mini flying probe to look for the presence of water-ice.				
Blue Ghost M2	Blue Ghost lander	NET 2027	Falcon 9 B5	(United States) Firefly Aerospace	Lander
Blue Ghost M2	Elytra orbital vehicle	NET 2027	Falcon 9 B5	(United States) Firefly Aerospace	Orbiter
Blue Ghost M2	Second mission of Firefly Aerospace, part of CLPS, includes 2 stage variant of blue ghost.				
Lunar Pathfinder	Lunar Pathfinder	NET 2027	Falcon 9 B5	ESA	Relay satellite
Lunar Pathfinder	Lunar communications satellite to support future lunar missions, along with Blue Ghost M2.				
IM-3	Nova-C	NET 2027	Falcon 9 B5	(United States) Intuitive Machines	Lander
IM-3	Khon2	NET 2027	Falcon 9 B5	(United States) Intuitive Machines	Relay satellite
IM-3	CADRE x3	NET 2027	Falcon 9 B5	(United States) NASA	Rovers
IM-3	Lunar Vertex	NET 2027	Falcon 9 B5	(United States) NASA, (United States) Lunar Outpost	Rover
IM-3	Third Nova-C. Payloads delivery for NASA's CLPS and for private customers. Lunar Vertex mission.				
Astrobotic mission 3	TBA	2027	Falcon Heavy	(United States) Astrobotic	Lander
Astrobotic mission 3	⚀ LunaGrid-Lite CubeRover	2027	Falcon Heavy	(United States) Astrobotic	Rover
Astrobotic mission 3	Lunaris Platform	2027	Falcon Heavy	(United States) Astrobotic	Deployable platform
Astrobotic mission 3	Third lunar mission by Astrobotic, will land at lunar south pole. LunaGrid-Lite mission.				
Blue Moon Pathfinder Mission 1	Blue Moon	NET Q1 2027	New Glenn	(United States) Blue Origin	Lander
Blue Moon Pathfinder Mission 1	First mission for the Blue Moon lander platform developed by Blue Origin and will prove the viability of the platform and BE-7 engine. It has a cargo capacity of up to 3000 kg.				
Starship Demo mission	Starship HLS	March 2027	Starship	(United States) SpaceX	Lander
Starship Demo mission	Uncrewed demo mission of Starship HLS.				
Starship cargo mission	Starship HLS	TBD	Starship	(United States) SpaceX	Lander
Starship cargo mission	First SpaceX lunar cargo mission, yet to be announced by SpaceX itself.				
FLEX	FLEX	Beyond 2028	Starship	(United States) Astrolab	Rover
FLEX	Large Lunar rover, can accommodate cargo and 2 astronauts.				
ZeusX	ZeusX service module	Q4 2027	TBD	(Singapore) Qosmosys	Orbiter
ZeusX	ZeusX lunar lander	Q4 2027	TBD	(Singapore) Qosmosys	Lander
ZeusX	LIBER	Q4 2027	TBD	(Singapore) Qosmosys	Rover
ZeusX	First lunar landing attempt for Singapore, lander can carry up to 800 kg to lunar surface.				
Mission 2.5	Argo OTV	2027	TBD	(United States) Argo Space	Transfer vehicle
Mission 2.5	Alpine	2027	TBD	(United States) ispace-U.S.	Relay satellite
Mission 2.5	ispace Mission 2.5. First satellite for ispace's Lunar Connect Service.				
Chandrayaan-4	Chandrayaan-4	2027–2028	LVM3	(India) ISRO	Lander
Chang'e 8	Chang'e 8 Orbiter	2029	Long March 5	(China) CNSA	Orbiter
Chang'e 8	Chang'e 8 Lander	2029	Long March 5	(China) CNSA	Lander
Chang'e 8	Chang'e 8 Rover	2029	Long March 5	(China) CNSA	Rover
Chang'e 8	Chang'e 8 Robot	2029	Long March 5	(China) CNSA	Hopper
Chang'e 8	South pole lander. Testing technology for using local resources and manufacturing with 3D printing.				
Mission 3	ULTRA	2028	TBD	(Japan) ispace	Lander
Mission 3	Lupine	2028	TBD	(United States) ispace-U.S.	Relay satellite
Mission 3	ispace Mission 3. First flight of ispace's ULTRA lunar lander.				
Jinnah-1	South pole Rover	2028	Long March 5	(Pakistan) SUPARCO	Rover
Jinnah-1	Pakistan's first lunar rover; will be launched aboard the Chang'e 8 mission as a part of the wider ILRS program.				
Uncrewed Blue Moon Demo mission	Blue Moon HLS	2028	New Glenn	(United States) Blue Origin	Lander
Uncrewed Blue Moon Demo mission	Cislunar Transporter	2028	New Glenn	(United States) Lockheed Martin	Transfer vehicle
Uncrewed Blue Moon Demo mission	Demo mission of Blue Moon lander system in preparation for crewed landing in 2029.				
Artemis IV Starship HLS delivery	Starship HLS	2028	Starship	(United States) SpaceX	Lander
Artemis IV Starship HLS delivery	Delivery of Starship HLS for Artemis IV mission.				
Artemis V Blue Moon HLS delivery	Blue Moon HLS	2028	New Glenn	(United States) Blue Origin	Lander
Artemis V Blue Moon HLS delivery	Cislunar Transporter	2028	New Glenn	(United States) Lockheed Martin	Transfer vehicle
Artemis V Blue Moon HLS delivery	Delivery of Blue Moon HLS for Artemis V mission.				
Luna 26	Luna 26	2028-2029	Soyuz-2.1b / Fregat	(Russia) Roscosmos	Orbiter
Luna 26	Orbiter, part of the Luna-Glob programme. Will scout for Luna 27 landing site.				
Lunar Polar Exploration Mission (LUPEX)	LUPEX lander	2028–2029	H3	(India) ISRO	Lander
Lunar Polar Exploration Mission (LUPEX)	LUPEX rover	2028–2029	H3	(Japan) JAXA	Rover
Canadian lunar rover mission	Canadensys Lunar Rover	2029	TBD	(Canada) Canadensys, (Canada) CSA	Rover
Canadian lunar rover mission	First Canadian lunar rover. Will fly as part of NASA's Commercial Lunar Payload Services initiative with Blue Ghost 4.				
Mission 4	ULTRA	2029	TBD	ESA (Japan) ispace	Lander
Mission 4	Lunar Orbiting Satellite 3 & 4	2029	TBD	(United States) ispace-U.S.	Relay satellites
Mission 4	ispace Mission 4. ESA Mission for Advanced Geophysics and Polar Ice Exploration (MAGPIE).				
Luna 27	Luna 27A and Luna 27B	2029–2030	Angara A5 / Fregat	(Russia) Roscosmos	Lander
Luna 27	Landers, part of the Luna-Glob programme.				
TBD (CLPS Lander)	Moon to Mars Initiative: Trailblazer (Roo-ver)	2029–2030	TBD	(Australia) Australian Space Agency	Rover
Mission 5	ULTRA	2030	Falcon 9 B5	(United States) ispace-U.S. (United States) Draper	Lander
Mission 5	Lunar Orbiting Satellite 5	2030	Falcon 9 B5	(United States) ispace-U.S.	Relay satellite
Mission 5	ispace Mission 5. CLPS CP-12.				
Argonaut 1	Argonaut Lander	2030	Ariane 64	ESA	Lander
Argonaut 1	Robotic Lander system. Will act as resupply vehicle for future Moonbase.				
Argonaut 2	Argonaut Lander	TBA	Ariane 64	ESA	Lander
Argonaut 2	NovaMoon payload				
KLEP	KLLR Lander	NET 2032	KSLV-III	(South Korea) KARI	Lander
KLEP	KLLR Rover	NET 2032	KSLV-III	(South Korea) KARI	Rover
KLEP	Second mission of the Korean Lunar Exploration Program.				
Lunar Voyage 3	Mapp	TBA	TBA	(United States) Lunar Outpost	Rover
Lunar Voyage 3	First fully commercial mission of Lunar Outpost MAPP program.				

==== Crewed ====
Agency or company	Name	Spacecraft	Launch date	Launch vehicle	Notes
(United States) NASA	Artemis IV	Orion, Starship HLS	H1 2028	SLS Block 1 Starship	First Artemis crewed lunar landing.
(United States) NASA	Artemis V	Orion, Blue Moon HLS	Late 2028	SLS Block 1 New Glenn	Crewed surface expedition.
(China) CMSA	Chinese crewed lunar mission	Mengzhou, Lanyue	~2030	Long March 10	Two launches of LM-10 to put a pair of astronauts on the Moon for a 6-hour stay.

=== Proposed but full funding still unclear ===
==== Robotic and crewed ====
The following missions have been proposed but their full funding is unclear:

Agency or company	Mission	Name of spacecraft	Proposed launch	Notes
(Canada) GEC	⚀ Doge-1		September 2026	12U CubeSat, the mission is being paid for entirely with the cryptocurrency Dogecoin. First Canadian lunar mission.
(Israel) SpaceIL	Beresheet 2	Orbiter	TBD	One orbiter, two landers.
(Israel) SpaceIL	Beresheet 2	Lander 1	TBD	One orbiter, two landers.
(Israel) SpaceIL	Beresheet 2	Lander 2	TBD	One orbiter, two landers.
(Brazil) Airvantis	Garatéa-L		TBD	Proposed lunar CubeSat, Partnership between UKSA and ESA.
(Germany) OHB (Israel) IAI	LSAS lander		TBD	Proposed commercial lander, will rideshare with a Geostationary satellite.
(United States) Parsec	Parsec lunar satellites		2026	Parsec lunar communication constellation.
ESA	Lunar Meteoroid Impact Observer		2027	Proposed CubeSat to observe asteroid impacts on Far side of Moon.
(Netherlands) Delft University of Technology	Lunar zebro		NET 2028	Small swarming rover, radiation measurements
(Turkey) Turkish Space Agency	AYAP-2	Lander	2028	Soft landing mission
(Turkey) Turkish Space Agency	AYAP-2	Rover	2028	Soft landing mission
(Russia) Roscosmos	Zeus		2030	Nuclear Propelled Space Tug, might deliver payloads to the Moon
(China) CNSA (Russia) Roscosmos	International Lunar Research Station (ILRS 1–5)		2031–2035	5 crucial missions planned for comprehensive establishment of ILRS to complete the in-orbit and surface facilities.
(Russia) Roscosmos	Luna 29		2032	Orbiter, part of the Luna-Glob program.
(Russia) Roscosmos	Luna 28		2034	Proposed sample-return mission, part of the Luna-Glob program. May include a small rover.
(Russia) Roscosmos	Luna 30		2036	Lander, part of the Luna-Glob program. Will include Luna-Grunt rovers.
(India) ISRO	Indian Lunar Crewed Mission		~2040	National effort to send an Indian astronaut to the Moon using India's own rocket and technology
(United States) NASA	BOLAS		TBD	2 tethered CubeSats on a very low lunar orbit.
(Canada) Magellan Aerospace	Autonomous Impactor for Lunar Exploration		TBD	Impactor for LEAP
(United States) NASA	Lunar Crater Radio Telescope		TBD	Radio telescope made by 4 rovers
(United States) LiftPort Group	Lunar space elevator		October 2028	Creating a reusable, replaceable and expandable Lunar elevator to open up the resources present on the Moon

== Lunar rovers ==
Mission	Rover	Country/Agency	Date of landing	Coordinates	Operational time	Distance travelled	Outcome
Luna E-8 No.201	Lunokhod	(Soviet Union) Lavochkin	19 February 1969	N/A	0 days	0 km	Launch failure
Luna E-8 No.201	First launch of the Lunokhod rover. Launch vehicle disintegrated 51 seconds after launch and exploded.						
Luna 17	Lunokhod 1	(Soviet Union) USSR	17 November 1970		322 days	10.5 km (6.5 mi)	Successful
Luna 17	First rover on an extraterrestrial body.						
Luna 21	Lunokhod 2	(Soviet Union) USSR	15 January 1973		117 days	39 km (24 mi)	Successful
Luna 21	Farthest distance traveled on the Moon.						
Chang'e 3	Yutu	(China) CNSA	14 December 2013		42 days (mobile); 973 days (total)	114.8 m (377 ft)	Successful
Chang'e 3	First Chinese extraterrestrial rover and first lunar rover in over 40 years.						
Chang'e 4	Yutu-2	(China) CNSA	3 January 2019		2873 days	1.455 km (0.904 mi) as of 3 January 2023	Operational
Chang'e 4	First rover on the far side of the Moon. Longest fully functioning rover on the Moon.						
Chandrayaan-2	Pragyan	(India) ISRO	6 September 2019		0 days	0 km	Precluded
Chandrayaan-2	Lost when Vikram lander crash landed on the Moon.						
Hakuto-R Mission 1	Rashid	(United Arab Emirates) MBRSC	April 2023		0 days	0 km	Precluded
Hakuto-R Mission 1	Sora-Q	(Japan) Tomy/JAXA/Doshisha University	April 2023		0 days	0 km	Precluded
Hakuto-R Mission 1	Contact lost during final descent of the Hakuto-R Mission 1 lander. Presumed crash landing and failure.						
Chandrayaan-3	Pragyan	(India) ISRO	23 August 2023		12 days	101.4 m (333 ft) as of 2 September 2023	Successful
Chandrayaan-3	First rover to successfully operate near lunar south pole.						
SLIM	LEV-1	(Japan) JAXA	19 January 2024		1 hour and 51 minutes		Successful
SLIM	LEV-2 (Sora-Q)	(Japan) JAXA	19 January 2024		1 hour and 51 minutes		Successful
SLIM	A hopper and a rover included in the SLIM mission which demonstrated precision landing technology.						
Peregrine Mission One	Iris	(United States) CMU	2024	N/A	0 days	0 km	Precluded
Peregrine Mission One	Colmena x5	(Mexico) UNAM	2024	N/A	0 days	0 km	Precluded
Peregrine Mission One	Colmena would have been deployed using a small catapult mechanism. Mission cancelled along with the cancelled landing of Peregrine lander due to excessive propellant leak.						
Chang'e 6	Jinchan	(China) CNSA	1 June 2024		4 days		Successful
Chang'e 6	Conduct infrared spectroscopy of lunar surface and imaged Chang'e 6 lander on lunar surface.						
IM-2	MAPP LV1	(United States) Lunar Outpost	6 March 2025		0 days	0 km	Precluded
IM-2	AstroAnt	(United States) MIT	6 March 2025		0 days	0 km	Precluded
IM-2	Micro-Nova	(United States) Intuitive Machines	6 March 2025		0 days	0 km	Precluded
IM-2	Yaoki	(Japan) Dymon	6 March 2025		0 days	0 km	Precluded
IM-2	MAPP and Micro-Nova would have demonstrated a new lunar communication system. IM-2 landed on 6 March 2025. The spacecraft was intact after touchdown but resting on its side, thereby complicating its planned science and technology demonstration mission; this outcome is similar to what occurred with the company's IM-1 Odysseus spacecraft in 2024.						
Hakuto-R Mission 2	Tenacious	(Luxembourg) ispace Europe	June 2025		0 days	0 km	Precluded
Hakuto-R Mission 2	Hakuto-R Mission 2 featured a rover for surface exploration and data collection. Contact lost during final descent of the Hakuto-R Mission 2 lander. Presumed crash landing and failure.						
Chang’e 7	Chang’e 7 rover	(China) CNSA	2027 (TBD)	TBD			Planned
Chang’e 7	Chang’e 7 hopper	(China) CNSA	2027 (TBD)	TBD			Planned
Chang’e 7	Will search for water ice in and around Shackleton crater in the south pole of the Moon.						
Griffin-1	CubeRover-1	(United States) Astrobotic	2026	TBD			Planned
Griffin-1	FLIP	(United States) Astrolab	2026	TBD			Planned
IM-3	Lunar Vertex	(United States) NASA	2026	TBD			Planned
IM-3	CADRE x4	(United States) NASA	2026	TBD			Planned
IM-3	Mission to study Reiner Gamma.						
Starship lunar cargo mission	FLEX	(United States) Astrolab	TBD	TBD			Planned
Starship lunar cargo mission	Astrolab contracted with SpaceX to send their rover to the Moon aboard Starship						
Griffin-2	⚀ LunaGrid-Lite CubeRover	(United States) Astrobotic	2027	TBD			Planned
Griffin-2	Third lunar mission by Astrobotic, will land at lunar south pole. LunaGrid-Lite mission.						
LUPEX	LUPEX Rover	(Japan) JAXA (India) ISRO	2028	TBD			Planned
LUPEX	Joint mission between ISRO and JAXA.						
Chang’e 8	Chang’e 8 rover	(China) CNSA	2028	TBD			Planned
Chang’e 8	Chang’e 8 Robot	(China) CNSA	2028	TBD			Planned
Chang’e 8	Chinese ISRU mission in preparation for ILRS.						
Jinnah-1	South Pole Rover	(Pakistan) SUPARCO	2028	TBD			Planned
Jinnah-1	South Pole Rover	Pakistan's first Lunar rover that will be launched aboard the Chang'e 8 mission. The mission is part of the wider ILRS program.					
IM-5	Roo-ver	(Australia) ASA	2030	Mons Malapert	~14 Days	TBD	Planned
IM-5	Roo-ver	Australia's first Lunar Rover,					
KLEP	KLLR Rover	(South Korea) KARI	2032	TBD			Planned
KLEP	Second mission of the Korean Lunar Exploration Program.						
PROMISE	PROMISE	(United States) NASA	late 2028	TBD			Proposed
PROMISE	Twin engineering model of the Mars rover Perseverance.						

== Unrealized concepts ==
=== 1960s ===
- Soviet crewed lunar programs – The Soviet Union had been pursuing a crewed lunar flyby mission using Soyuz 7K-L1 launched aboard Proton-K and a crewed landing mission using Soyuz 7K-LOK and LK Lander launched aboard N1 rocket. After a series of N1 failures, both of these programs were cancelled in 1970 and 1976 respectively.

=== 1970s ===
- Canceled Apollo missions – The Apollo program had three more missions lined up until Apollo 20, but the missions beyond Apollo 17, the sixth and final landing mission, were cancelled due to budget constraints, change in technical direction and hardware delays. The ambitions shifted towards developing next generation rockets like Space Shuttle, the space station Skylab and in exploration programs such as Grand Tour program.

=== 2000s ===
- Constellation Program – The Constellation program ran from 2004 to 2010 and would have utilised the Ares I and Ares V rockets alongside the Orion spacecraft and Altair lunar lander to return astronauts to the Moon by 2020 in preparation for crewed missions to Mars. It was cancelled in October 2010 by the Augustine Committee. However, the Orion was spared and finally launched in November 2022 with Constellation and its rockets revised as the Artemis Program and Space Launch System.

=== 2010s ===
- Resource Prospector – Concept by NASA of a rover that would have performed a survey expedition on a polar region of the Moon. It was cancelled in April 2018.
- Indo-Russian joint mission – A joint mission between India and Russia for a robotic lander and rover was under development since 2007. Russia was supposed to develop the lander while India would develop an orbiter, a rover and launch the composite. However, with failure of Fobos-Grunt mission, Russia was unable to provide the lander in time and requested India to accept the delay and risk. The collaboration ended with India repurposing its orbiter towards Mars with its Mars Orbiter Mission in 2013. India would later go on to develop and launch its Chandrayaan-2 and Chandrayaan-3 mission, using an indigenously developed lander.

=== 2020s ===
- DearMoon was an unrealized tourist mission financed by Japanese entrepreneur Yusaku Maezawa. Maezawa and six to eight other civilians would have performed a lunar flyby in a SpaceX Starship. It was cancelled on June 1, 2024.

== See also ==
- Exploration of the Moon
- List of extraterrestrial orbiters
- List of rovers on extraterrestrial bodies
- List of artificial objects on the Moon
- List of lunar probes
- Moon landing
- Timeline of Solar System exploration
  - List of missions to Venus
  - List of missions to Mars
  - List of missions to minor planets
  - List of missions to the outer planets
