= Luna E-6LS No.112 =

Soviet space probe (Luna 1968A)

E-6LS No.112
- Mission type: Lunar orbiter Technology
- Operator: Soviet space program
- Mission duration: Failed to orbit

Spacecraft properties
- Spacecraft type: E-6LS
- Manufacturer: OKB-1
- Launch mass: 1,700 kilograms (3,700 lb)

Start of mission
- Launch date: 7 February 1968, 10:43:54 UTC
- Rocket: Molniya-M 8K78M s/n Ya716-57
- Launch site: Baikonur 1/5

Luna E-6LS No.112, sometimes identified by NASA as Luna 1968A, was a Soviet spacecraft which was lost in a launch failure in 1968. It was a 1,700-kilogram (3,700 lb) Luna E-6LS spacecraft, the second of three to be launched. The spacecraft was intended to enter Selenocentric orbit, where it would study the Moon, and demonstrate technology for future crewed Lunar missions.

Luna E-6LS No.112 was launched at 10:43:54 on 7 February 1968, atop a Molniya-M 8K78M carrier rocket with a Blok-L upper stage, flying from Site 1/5 at the Baikonur Cosmodrome. During third stage flight, a fuel valve or inlet became stuck, resulting in the gas generator consuming fuel at a higher rate than normal. The rocket ran out of fuel 524.6 seconds after launch, and consequently failed to reach orbit. Prior to the release of information about its mission, NASA correctly identified that it had been an attempt to place a spacecraft into orbit around the Moon, and that the later Luna 14 spacecraft had the same configuration.
