= Luna 7 =

1965 crewless Soviet space probe

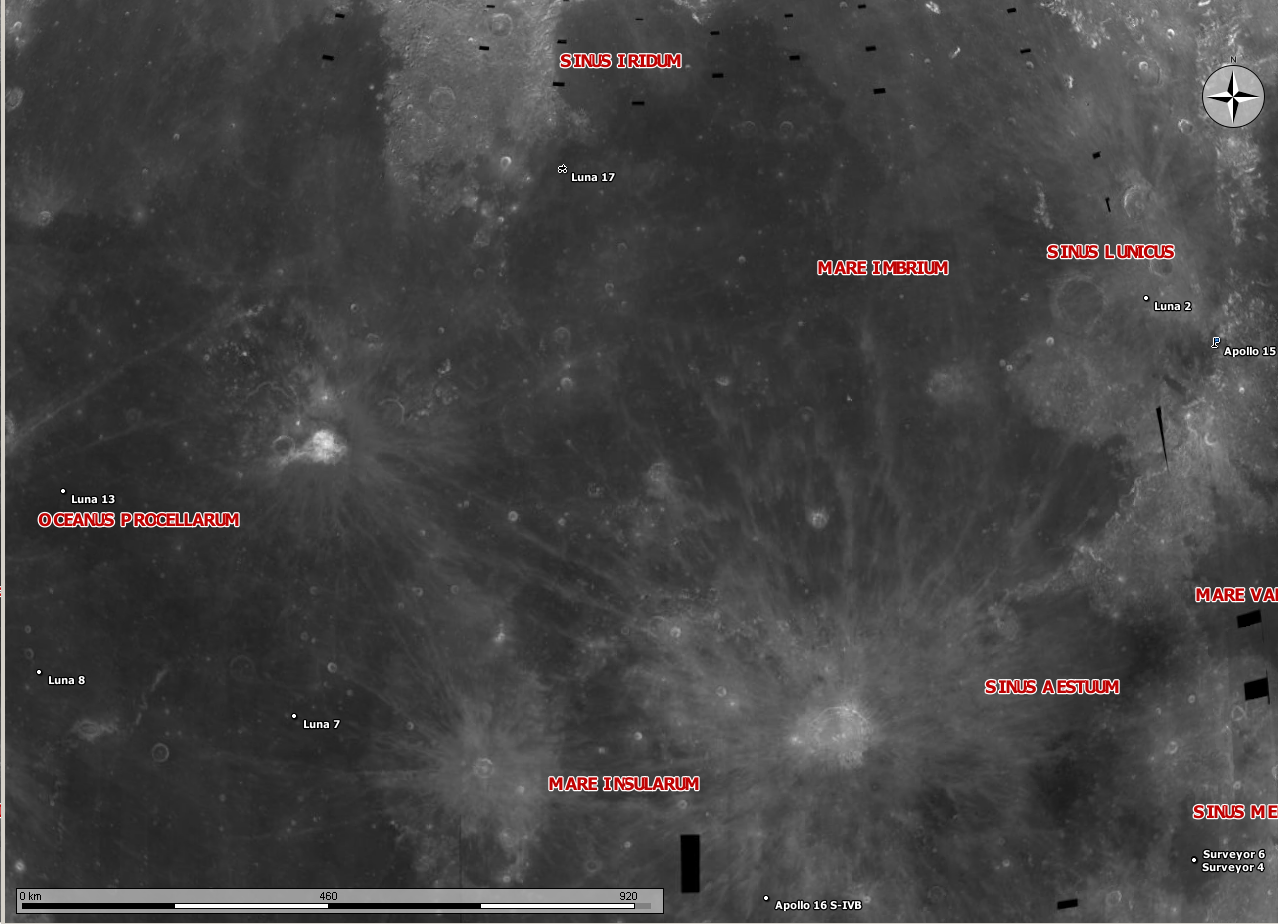
- Lunar map showing the location of Luna 7 in relation to other rovers and landing sites. Lower left, on top of the scale bar
- Mission type: Lunar lander
- Operator: Soviet space program
- COSPAR ID: 1965-077A
- SATCAT no.: 01610
- Mission duration: 3 days

Spacecraft properties
- Spacecraft type: Ye-6
- Manufacturer: OKB-1
- Launch mass: 1,504 kilograms (3,316 lb)

Start of mission
- Launch date: October 4, 1965, 07:55 UTC
- Rocket: Molniya-M 8K78M
- Launch site: Baikonur 1/5

Lunar impact (failed landing)
- Impact date: October 7, 1965, 22:08 UTC
- Impact site: 9.8°N 47.8°W

Luna 7 (E-6 or Ye-6 series) was an uncrewed space mission of the Soviet Luna program, also called Lunik 7.

== Mission ==
The Luna 7 spacecraft was intended to achieve a soft landing on the Moon. However, due to premature retrofire and cutoff of the retrorockets, the spacecraft impacted the lunar surface in Oceanus Procellarum. Unlike its predecessors, Luna 7 successfully carried out its mid-course correction on October 5 on the way to the Moon, in anticipation of a soft-landing two days later. However, immediately prior to planned retro-fire during the approach to the lunar surface, the spacecraft suddenly lost attitude control and failed to regain it. Automatic programmed systems then prevented the main engine from firing. As controllers observed helplessly, Luna 7 plummeted to the lunar surface at a very high speed, crashing at 22:08:24 UT on October 7, 1965, west of the Kepler crater, relatively near the actual intended target. Impact coordinates were 9.8°N 47.8°W.

Later investigation indicated that the optical sensor of the astronavigation system had been set at the wrong angle and had lost sight of Earth during the critical attitude-control maneuver. It was the tenth consecutive failure in the Ye-6 program.

== See also ==
- List of artificial objects on the Moon
- List of missions to the Moon
