= Luna E-6 No.5 =

Soviet spacecraft

- Mission type: Lunar lander
- Operator: Soviet space program
- Mission duration: Failed to orbit

Spacecraft properties
- Spacecraft type: Ye-6
- Manufacturer: OKB-1
- Launch mass: 1,422 kilograms (3,135 lb)

Start of mission
- Launch date: 20 April 1964, 08:08:28 UTC
- Rocket: Molniya-M 8K78M s/n T15000-21
- Launch site: Baikonur 1/5

Luna E-6 No.5, sometimes identified by NASA as Luna 1964B, was a Soviet spacecraft which was lost in a launch failure in 1964. It was a 1,422-kilogram (3,135 lb) Luna Ye-6 spacecraft, the fifth of twelve to be launched. It was intended to be the first spacecraft to perform a soft landing on the Moon, a goal which would eventually be accomplished by the final Ye-6 spacecraft, Luna 9.

Luna E-6 No.5 was launched at 08:08:28 UTC on 20 April 1964, atop a Molniya-M 8K78M carrier rocket, flying from Site 1/5 at the Baikonur Cosmodrome. The power system on the upper stage malfunctioned 340 seconds into the flight, causing the engine to cut off before reaching orbit. The upper stage and spacecraft disintegrated upon reentry into the atmosphere shortly afterwards. Prior to the release of information about its mission, NASA correctly identified that it had been an attempt to land a spacecraft on the Moon.
