= Kosmos 111 =

Failed Soviet lunar orbiter

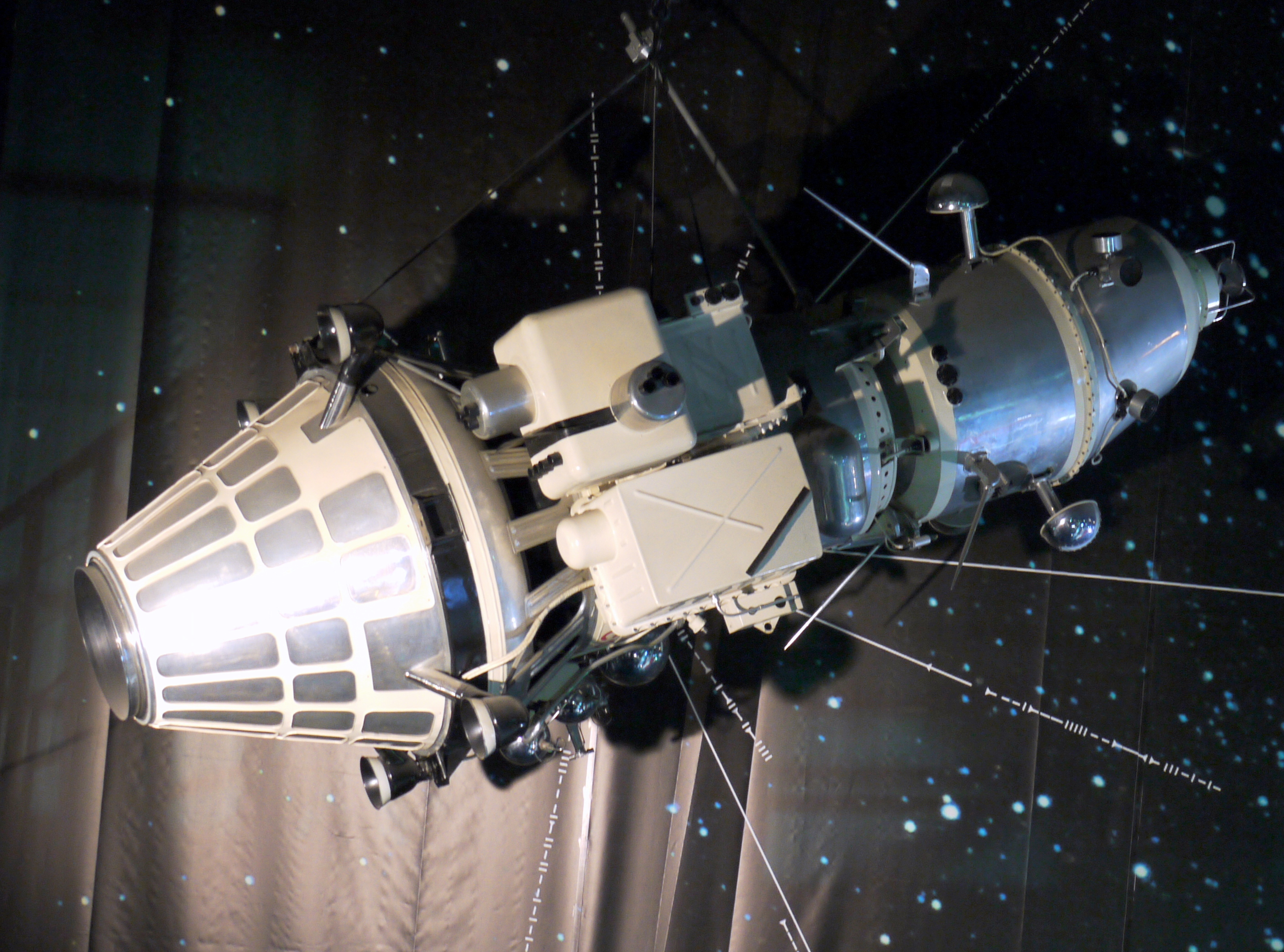
- Kosmos 111 is identical in design with Luna 10
- Mission type: Lunar orbiter
- Operator: Soviet space program
- COSPAR ID: 1966-017A
- SATCAT no.: 2093
- Mission duration: 2 days

Spacecraft properties
- Spacecraft type: E-6S
- Manufacturer: GSMZ Lavochkin
- Launch mass: 6540 kg
- Dry mass: 1580 kg

Start of mission
- Launch date: 1 March 1966, 11:03:49 GMT
- Rocket: Molniya-M
- Launch site: Baikonur 31/6

End of mission
- Disposal: Launch failure
- Decay date: 3 March 1966

Orbital parameters
- Reference system: Geocentric
- Regime: Low Earth
- Perigee altitude: 182 km
- Apogee altitude: 194 km
- Inclination: 51.9°
- Period: 88.6 minutes
- Epoch: 1 March 1966

Kosmos 111 (Russian: Космос 111 meaning Cosmos 111), E-6S No.204, was the first Soviet attempt to orbit a spacecraft around the Moon. The design was similar to the future successful Luna 10 spacecraft. Kosmos 111 was produced in less than a month, one of two spacecraft developed from the E-6 lander bus in a crash program to upstage America's Lunar Orbiter series and to commemorate the 23rd Congress of the Communist Party of the Soviet Union (CPSU), held in March 1966.

== Spacecraft ==
Kosmos 111 was designated an E-6S spacecraft, consisting of an E-6 bus attached to a cylindrical pressurized 245 kg lunar orbiter module. It was 1.5 metres (4.9 ft) tall and 75 centimetres (2.46 ft) in diameter at the base. The main propulsion systems for lunar orbit insertion were on the bus, and the science payload was carried on the orbiter module. The payload comprised seven instruments: a gamma-ray spectrometer for energies between 0.3–3 MeV, a triaxial magnetometer (on the end of a 1.5-meter boom), a piezoelectric micrometeoroid detector, instruments for solar-plasma studies, devices for measuring infrared emissions from the Moon, low energy X-ray detectors, and a bank of charged particle detectors. Additionally, the radio system could be used for gravitational and radio occultation studies. The lunar orbiting module was battery-powered and communications were via 183 MHz and 922 MHz aerials.

== Scientific instruments ==
Seven scientific instruments:

- Magnetometer
- Gamma-ray spectrometer
- Five gas-discharge counters
- Two ion traps and a charged particle trap
- Piezoelectric micrometer detector
- Infrared detector
- Low-energy X-ray photon counters

== Mission ==
This mission was intended to orbit the Moon and was configured identically to the future Luna 10 mission (1966-027A). It was launched on 1 March 1966 at 11:03:49 GMT via Molniya 8K78M s/n U15000-50 rocket from Site 31/6 into Earth parking orbit, but the Blok-L upper stage lost roll control and failed to fire the spacecraft into a lunar trajectory. It had a perigee of 182 kilometres (113 mi), an apogee of 194 kilometres (121 mi), an inclination of 51.9°, and an orbital period of 88.6 minutes. It was designated Kosmos 111 and reentered two days after launch, on 3 March 1966.

The craft weighed 6,540 kilograms (14,420 lb) and was not immediately acknowledged to be a Luna vehicle after its destruction. The official Soviet media named the stranded satellite Kosmos 111.
