= Luna E-6 No.8 =

1965 Soviet space launch failure

- Mission type: Lunar lander
- Operator: Soviet space program
- Mission duration: Failed to orbit

Spacecraft properties
- Spacecraft type: Ye-6
- Manufacturer: OKB-1
- Launch mass: 1,422 kilograms (3,135 lb)

Start of mission
- Launch date: 10 April 1965,
- Rocket: Molniya-L 8K78L s/n R103-26
- Launch site: Baikonur 1/5

Luna E-6 No.8 (Ye-6 series), sometimes identified by NASA as Luna 1965A, was a Soviet spacecraft which was lost in a launch failure in 1965. It was a 1,422-kilogram (3,135 lb) Luna Ye-6 spacecraft, the seventh of twelve to be launched, It was intended to be the first spacecraft to perform a soft landing on the Moon, a goal which would eventually be accomplished by the final Ye-6 spacecraft, Luna 9.

Luna E-6 No.8 was launched on 10 April 1965, atop a Molniya-L 8K78L carrier rocket, flying from Site 1/5 at the Baikonur Cosmodrome. During third stage flight, a nitrogen pipeline in the oxidiser tank depressurised, which caused a loss of oxidiser flow to the engine and resulted in the engine cutting off. The spacecraft failed to achieve orbit, and the spacecraft disintegrated on reentry. Prior to the release of information about its mission, NASA correctly identified that it had been an attempt to land a spacecraft on the Moon.
