= Luna E-6 No.3 =

1963 Soviet space launch attempt

- Mission type: Lunar lander
- Operator: Soviet space program
- Mission duration: Failed to orbit

Spacecraft properties
- Spacecraft type: E-6
- Manufacturer: OKB-1
- Launch mass: 1,422 kilograms (3,135 lb)

Start of mission
- Launch date: 3 February 1963, 09:29:14 UTC
- Rocket: Molniya-L 8K78/E6 s/n G103-10
- Launch site: Baikonur 1/5

Luna E-6 No.3, also identified as No.2 and sometimes by NASA as Luna 1963B, was a Soviet spacecraft which was lost in a launch failure in 1963. It was a 1,422-kilogram (3,135 lb) Luna E-6 spacecraft, the second of twelve to be launched, and the second consecutive launch failure. It was intended to be the first spacecraft to perform a soft landing on the Moon, a goal which would eventually be accomplished by the final E-6 spacecraft, Luna 9.

With the failure of the first E-6 attempt on 4 January 1963, the backup spacecraft and booster G103-10 were stacked atop LC-1 at Baikonur. Luna E-6 No.3 was launched at 09:26:14 UTC on 3 February 1963, atop a Molniya-L 8K78L carrier rocket, flying from Site 1/5 at the Baikonur Cosmodrome. This time the probe didn't even reach orbit--a malfunction occurred during the Blok I burn which resulted in the launcher reentering the atmosphere and impacting in the Pacific Ocean west of Hawaii. The reentry area was within range of US radar and it was immediately clear that an object of some kind had been launched from the Soviet Union--although Moscow customarily provided advance warnings for ICBM tests that launched into the ocean, this was not done for space launches, and although the Western press began reporting a failed Soviet space launch, the Soviet state media stubbornly held to its policy of not announcing unsuccessful space missions unless absolutely necessary and the launch was not officially acknowledged until the glasnost era of the late 1980s. The cause of the failure was quickly determined; the gyroscopes in the Blok I stage had been aligned incorrectly so that the flight trajectory was aimed to launch into the Pacific Ocean rather than orbit. The spacecraft failed to achieve orbit, and reentered the atmosphere over the Pacific Ocean. Prior to the release of information about its mission, NASA correctly identified that it had been an attempt to land a spacecraft on the Moon. However, they believed the launch had occurred on 2 February.
