= Luna 22 =

Soviet lunar orbiter

- Mission type: Lunar orbiter
- Operator: Soviet space program
- COSPAR ID: 1974-037A
- SATCAT no.: 7315
- Mission duration: 1 year and 6 months

Spacecraft properties
- Bus: Ye-8-LS
- Manufacturer: GSMZ Lavochkin
- Launch mass: 5,700 kilograms (12,600 lb)

Start of mission
- Launch date: 29 May 1974, 08:56:51 UTC
- Rocket: Proton-K/D
- Launch site: Baikonur 81/24

End of mission
- Deactivated: Early November 1975

Orbital parameters
- Reference system: Selenocentric
- Semi-major axis: 6,598.3 kilometres (4,100.0 mi)
- Eccentricity: 0.18
- Periselene altitude: 219 kilometres (136 mi)
- Aposelene altitude: 222 kilometres (138 mi)
- Inclination: 19.35 degrees
- Period: 130 minutes

Lunar orbiter
- Orbital insertion: 2 June 1974
- Orbits: ~3,875

Luna 22 (Ye-8-LS series) was an uncrewed space mission, part of the Soviet Luna program, also called Lunik 22.

== Overview ==
Luna 22 was a lunar orbiter mission. The spacecraft carried imaging cameras and also had the objectives of studying the Moon's magnetic field, surface gamma ray emissions and composition of lunar surface rocks, and the gravitational field, as well as micrometeorites and cosmic rays. Luna 22 was launched into Earth parking orbit and then to the Moon. It was inserted into a circular lunar orbit on 2 June 1974. The spacecraft made many orbit adjustments over its 18-month lifetime in order to optimize the operation of various experiments, lowering the perilune to as little as 25 km.

Luna 22 was the second of two "advanced" lunar orbiters, the first of which being Luna 19 . The orbiter was designed to conduct extensive scientific surveys from orbit. Well in route to the Moon, Luna 20 had to perform a single mid-course correction on 30 May, and entered lunar orbit on 2 June 1974. When the orbiter first entered orbit of the Moon, it started at periapsis altitude at 219 kilometres (136 mi) and apoapsis altitude as 222 kilometres (138 mi), and an inclination of 19°35', these orbital parameters changed throughout its mission. Throughout the orbiters various orbital changes, Luna 22 had performed without any problems, and it continued to return photos fifteen months into its mission, past the conclusion of its primary mission, which had ended by 2 April 1975. The maneuvering propellant on the spacecraft was depleted on 2 September 1975, and the mission was formally concluded in early November 1975, following a highly successful mission.

== See also ==
- Timeline of artificial satellites and space probes
