= Luna 14 =

Soviet lunar orbiter

- Mission type: Lunar orbiter Technology demonstration
- Operator: Soviet space program
- COSPAR ID: 1968-027A
- SATCAT no.: 03178
- Mission duration: 75 days

Spacecraft properties
- Spacecraft type: E-6LS
- Manufacturer: GSMZ Lavochkin
- Launch mass: 1,640 kilograms (3,620 lb)

Start of mission
- Launch date: 7 April 1968, 10:09:32 UTC
- Rocket: Molniya-M 8K78M
- Launch site: Baikonur 1/5

End of mission
- Last contact: 24 June 1968

Orbital parameters
- Reference system: Selenocentric
- Eccentricity: 0.16
- Periselene altitude: 1,894 kilometres (1,177 mi)
- Aposelene altitude: 2,607 kilometres (1,620 mi)
- Inclination: 42 degrees
- Period: 160 minutes
- Epoch: 9 April 1968, 19:00:00 UTC

Lunar orbiter
- Orbital insertion: 10 April 1968, 19:25 UTC

Luna 14 (E-6LS series) was an uncrewed space mission of the Luna program run by the Soviet Union. It was also called Lunik 14.

== Overview ==
The spacecraft is believed to have been similar to Luna 12 and the instrumentation was similar to that carried by Luna 10. It provided data for studies of the interaction of the Earth and lunar masses, the lunar gravitational field, the propagation and stability of radio communications to the spacecraft at different orbital positions, solar charged particles and cosmic rays, and the motion of the Moon. This flight was the final flight of the second generation of the Luna series.

Luna 14 successfully entered lunar orbit at 19:25 UT on 10 April 1968. Initial orbital parameters were 160 × 870 kilometers at 42° inclination. The primary goal of the flight was to test communications systems in support of the N1-L3 piloted lunar landing project. Ground tracking of the spacecraft's orbit also allowed controllers to accurately map lunar gravitational anomalies in order to predict trajectories of future lunar missions such as those of the LOK and LK lunar landing vehicles. Luna 14 also carried scientific instruments to study cosmic rays and charged particles from the Sun, although few details have been revealed. The mission lasted 75 days.
