= Luna E-8-5 No. 402 =

Soviet space probe (Luna 1970C)

E-8-5 No.402
- Mission type: Lunar lander Sample return
- Operator: Soviet space program
- Mission duration: Failed to orbit

Spacecraft properties
- Spacecraft type: E-8-5
- Manufacturer: NPO Lavochkin
- Launch mass: 5,600 kilograms (12,300 lb)

Start of mission
- Launch date: 14 June 1969, 04:00:47 UTC
- Rocket: Proton-K/D s/n 238-01
- Launch site: Baikonur 81/24

Luna E-8-5 No.402, also known as Luna Ye-8-5 No.402, and sometimes identified by NASA as Luna 1969C, was a Soviet spacecraft under Luna programme which was lost in a launch failure in 1969. It was a 5,600-kilogram (12,300 lb) Luna E-8-5 spacecraft, the first of at least eleven to be launched. It was intended to perform a soft landing on the Moon, collect a sample of lunar soil, and return it to the Earth. It was, along with Luna 15, one of two unsuccessful missions which had been launched by the Soviet Union in a last-ditch attempt to upstage the Apollo 11 landing under Moon race.

== History ==
Luna E-8-5 No.402 was launched at 04:00:07 UTC on 14 June 1969 atop a Proton-K 8K78K carrier rocket with a Blok D upper stage, flying from Site 81/24 at the Baikonur Cosmodrome. The upper stage failed to ignite, and consequently the spacecraft failed to achieve orbit.

Prior to the release of information about its mission, NASA correctly identified that it had been an attempted sample return mission. However, they believed that a previous attempt had been made, using a spacecraft launched on 30 April, which had also been lost in a launch failure. They designated that attempt was Luna 1969B. No Luna spacecraft or Proton rocket was launched on that date.
