= Yaoki =

Japanese lunar rover

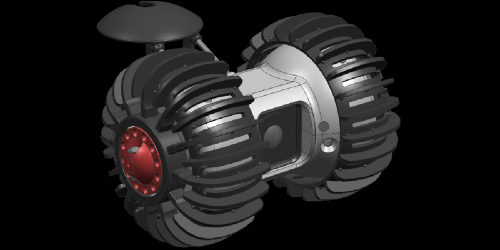
- Mission type: Lunar rover
- Operator: Dymon
- Website: https://dymon.co.jp/en/

Spacecraft properties
- Landing mass: 498 g

Start of mission
- Launch date: February 26, 2025, 7:02 pm EST (February 27, 2025, 00:02 UTC)
- Rocket: Falcon 9 Block 5
- Launch site: Kennedy LC-39A

Moon rover
- Landing date: 6 March 2025 (intended) (never deployed from partially destroyed lander)
- Landing site: Shackleton connecting ridge (intended)

Yaoki was a Moon rover made by Japanese company Dymon launched on 27 February 2025 by American company Intuitive Machine's IM-2 Athena lander. It landed on the Moon but deployment was not possible as the lander was on its side and the mission ended due to the landers' inability to recharge its batteries.

Yaoki was first announced in 2019. The rover weighs 498 grams (17.6 oz) and transportation to the Moon costs $1.2 million per kilogram.

== Name ==
Yaoki refers to the Japanese proverb 七転び八起き (nana korobi ya oki). This proverb means "To get back up again and again, no matter how many times you fail" (literally: "Seven times falling down, eight times risen up").

== Dymon ==
Yaoki is developed by Dymon Co. Ltd., which is led by robot creator Shinichiro Nakajima. As an automobile engineer, Nakajima also worked on the development of Audi's four-wheel drive system “quattro”, a defining feature of Audi vehicles since the 1980s. Dymon was founded by him with the aim of developing mobile lunar robots and ground robots. Dymon is a stylized version of the Japanese word 大門 (daimon), meaning "big gate."

== Cooperation with the Artemis Program and SpaceBit ==
=== Artemis Program ===
As a forerunner in NASA’s lunar development project, the Artemis Program, Yaoki aims to contribute to the field of mobility systems.

=== SpaceBit ===
During The 3rd International Moon Village Workshop & Symposium in Kyoto on December 5–8, 2019, Spacebit signed an agreement with Japanese-based space company Dymon on technical and mission collaboration within the next trip to Moon in July 2021.

First, from the technical side, Spacebit and Dymon will cooperate on the Moon as their Lunar rovers Asagumo and Yaoki will communicate with the Earth via Astrobotic lander. Within this mission cooperation, Spacebit and Dymon rovers will take each other's photo on the Moon using their own cameras.

Note that earlier in 2019, Spacebit and Dymon signed an agreement to deliver their first lunar rovers Asagumo and Yaoki on Astrobotic's upcoming Peregrine mission in 2021. Intuitive Machine's Nova-C lunar lander will be launched on a Falcon 9 Block 5 rocket from Space Launch Complex-41 at Cape Canaveral Air Force Station in Florida.

== Partners ==
- Nihon Unist
- UNIT Co
- Pixies Inc.
- UCHIDA Co
- Kokko Shisetsu Kogyo Co.
- Mitsubishi Chemical Corporation
- Kyushu Institute of Technology

== See also ==
- Sora-Q
- SLIM

== Videos ==
- YAOKI This little remote robot goes to the Moon in 2021
- Lunar rover YAOKI "The Birth"/ 月面探査車 YAOKI 「誕生編」
- Lunar rover YAOKI "Meet HOPE in Tanegashima" / 月面探査車 YAOKI 「種子島でHOPEに会う」
- Lunar rover YAOKI "IAC2019 to Astrobotic" / 月面探査車 YAOKI 「IAC2019 to Astrobotic」
- 月面ロボ YAOKI 「不死身なり」
- 【月面探査YAOKI】スタートアップ説明会に行ってきました！
- Lunar rover YAOKI "Autumn in Kyoto" / 月面探査車 YAOKI 「京都の秋」
- Lunar rover YAOKI "CEATEC2019" / 月面探査車 YAOKI 「CEATEC2019」
- Lunar rover YAOKI "SORA-FES ABLab" / 月面探査車 YAOKI 「宙フェス ABLab」
- 月面へ夢のせて 町工場発の小型探査ロボ
