= Luna E-6 No.6 =

Soviet spacecraft lost in 1964 at launch

- Mission type: Lunar lander
- Operator: Soviet space program
- Mission duration: Failed to orbit

Spacecraft properties
- Spacecraft type: Ye-6
- Manufacturer: OKB-1
- Launch mass: 1,422 kilograms (3,135 lb)

Start of mission
- Launch date: 21 March 1964, 08:15:35 UTC
- Rocket: Molniya-M 8K78M s/n T15000-20
- Launch site: Baikonur 1/5

Luna E-6 No.6, sometimes identified by NASA as Luna 1964A, and sometimes known in the West as Sputnik 27, was a Soviet spacecraft which was lost in a launch failure in 1964. It was a 1,422-kilogram (3,135 lb) Luna Ye-6 spacecraft, the fourth of twelve to be launched. It was intended to be the first spacecraft to perform a soft landing on the Moon, a goal which would eventually be accomplished by the final Ye-6 spacecraft, Luna 9.

Luna E-6 No.6 was launched at 08:15:35 UTC on 21 March 1964, atop a Molniya-M 8K78M carrier rocket, flying from Site 1/5 at the Baikonur Cosmodrome. A connecting rod in the Blok I stage broke, leading to a propellant valve failing to open completely. The stage developed insufficient thrust to reach orbit and it shut down at T+489 seconds. The upper stages and probe reentered the atmosphere and broke up. Prior to the release of information about its mission, NASA correctly identified that it had been an attempt to land a spacecraft on the Moon.
