= List of quadrangles on the Moon =

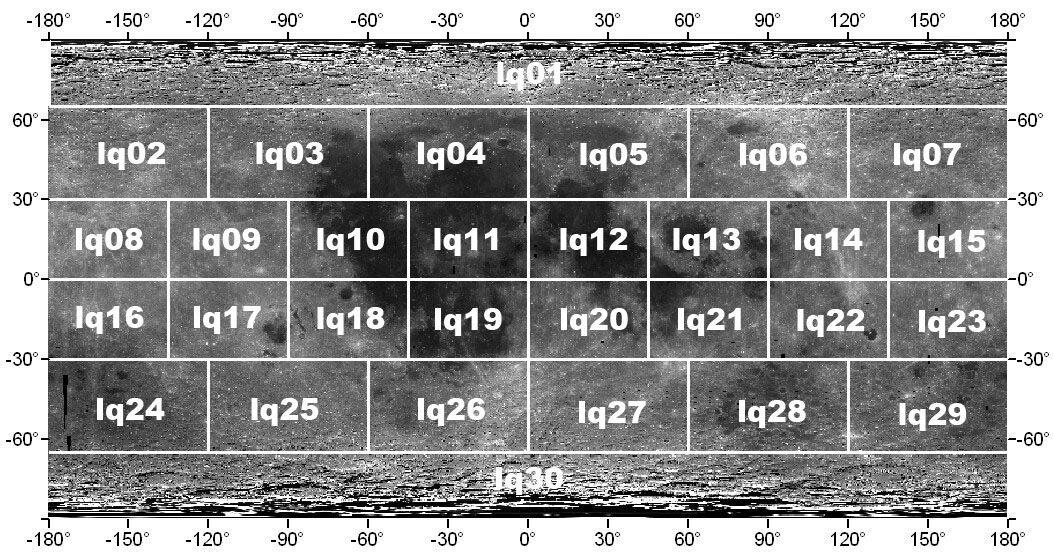
Layout of the 30 lunar quadrangles at the 1:2,500,000 map scale

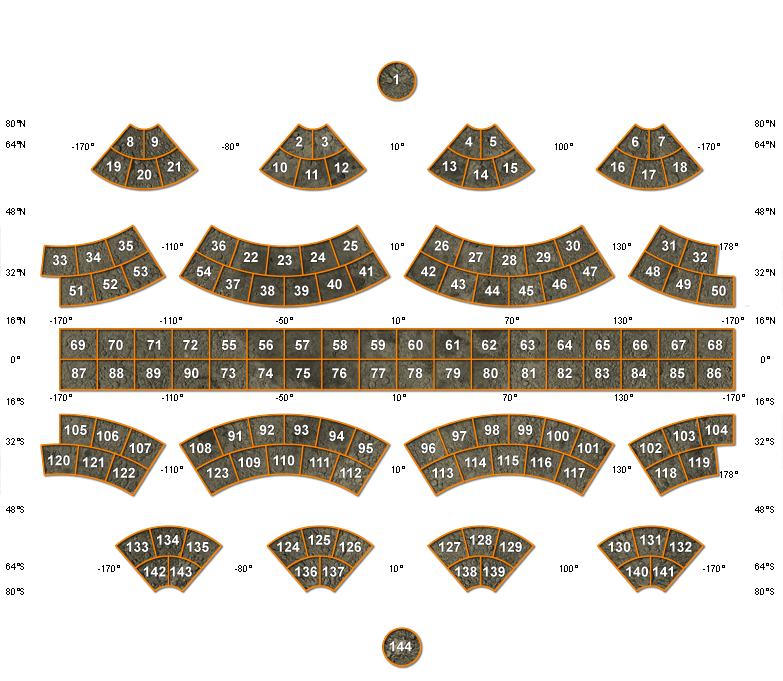
Layout of the 144 Lunar quadrangles at the 1:1,000,000 map scale

The Moon has been divided into 30 quadrangles by the United States Geological Survey at the 1:2,500,000 map scale. At the 1:1,000,000 scale it's divided into 144 quadrangles.

The quadrangles are numbered in bands from north to south. Each band is then divided into a latitude-dependent number of quadrangles. At the poles, the bands consist of a single quadrangle, so LQ01 is a circle around the north pole.

Quadrangles at the 1:2,500,000 scale
Name	Number	Latitude	Longitude
	LQ01	65° to 90°	−180° to 180°
	LQ02	30° to 65°	−180° to −120°
	LQ03	30° to 65°	−120° to −60°
	LQ04	30° to 65°	−60° to 0°
	LQ05	30° to 65°	0° to 60°
	LQ06	30° to 65°	60° to 120°
	LQ07	30° to 65°	120° to 180°
	LQ08	0° to 30°	−180° to −135°
	LQ09	0° to 30°	−135° to −90°
Marius	LQ10	0° to 30°	−90° to −45°
Copernicus	LQ11	0° to 30°	−45° to 0°
	LQ12	0° to 30°	0° to 45°
	LQ13	0° to 30°	45° to 90°
	LQ14	0° to 30°	90° to 135°
	LQ15	0° to 30°	135° to 180°
	LQ16	−30° to 0°	−180° to −135°
	LQ17	−30° to 0°	−135° to −90°
Grimaldi	LQ18	−30° to 0°	−90° to −45°
Mare Nubium	LQ19	−30° to 0°	−45° to 0°
	LQ20	−30° to 0°	0° to 45°
	LQ21	−30° to 0°	45° to 90°
	LQ22	−30° to 0°	90° to 135°
	LQ23	−30° to 0°	135° to 180°
	LQ24	−65° to −30°	−180° to −120°
	LQ25	−65° to −30°	−120° to −60°
	LQ26	−65° to −30°	−60° to 0°
	LQ27	−65° to −30°	0° to 60°
	LQ28	−65° to −30°	60° to 120°
Planck	LQ29	−65° to −30°	120° to 180°
Lunar South Pole	LQ30	−90° to −65°	−180° to 180°

Farside		Nearside				Farside	
LQ01
LQ02	LQ03		LQ04	LQ05	LQ06		LQ07
LQ08	LQ09	LQ10	LQ11	LQ12	LQ13	LQ14	LQ15
LQ16	LQ17	LQ18	LQ19	LQ20	LQ21	LQ22	LQ23
LQ24	LQ25		LQ26	LQ27	LQ28		LQ29
LQ30

At the 1:1,000,000 scale, there are 12 latitude bands, 6 in each hemisphere. The bands nearest the equator are 16° high, and the first and last bands are 10° radius circles around the poles. The bands are then divided into quadrangles, but unlike the 1:2,500,000 system, the seam is placed at +10° longitude (so 0° longitude is in the middle of a quadrangle), and the numbering within a band starts between −80° and −90°:

- (±90° to ±80°) 1 quadrangle of 360°, beginning at −80°
- (±80° to ±64°) 8 quadrangles of 45°, beginning at −80°
- (±64° to ±48°) 12 quadrangles of 30°, beginning at −80°
- (±48° to ±32°) 15 quadrangles of 24°, beginning at −86°
- (±32° to ±16°) 18 quadrangles of 20°, beginning at −90°
- (±16° to 0°) 18 quadrangles of 20°, beginning at −90°

== See also ==
- List of quadrangles on Mercury
- List of quadrangles on Venus
- List of quadrangles on Mars
