= Kosmos 60 =

Failed Soviet lunar lander

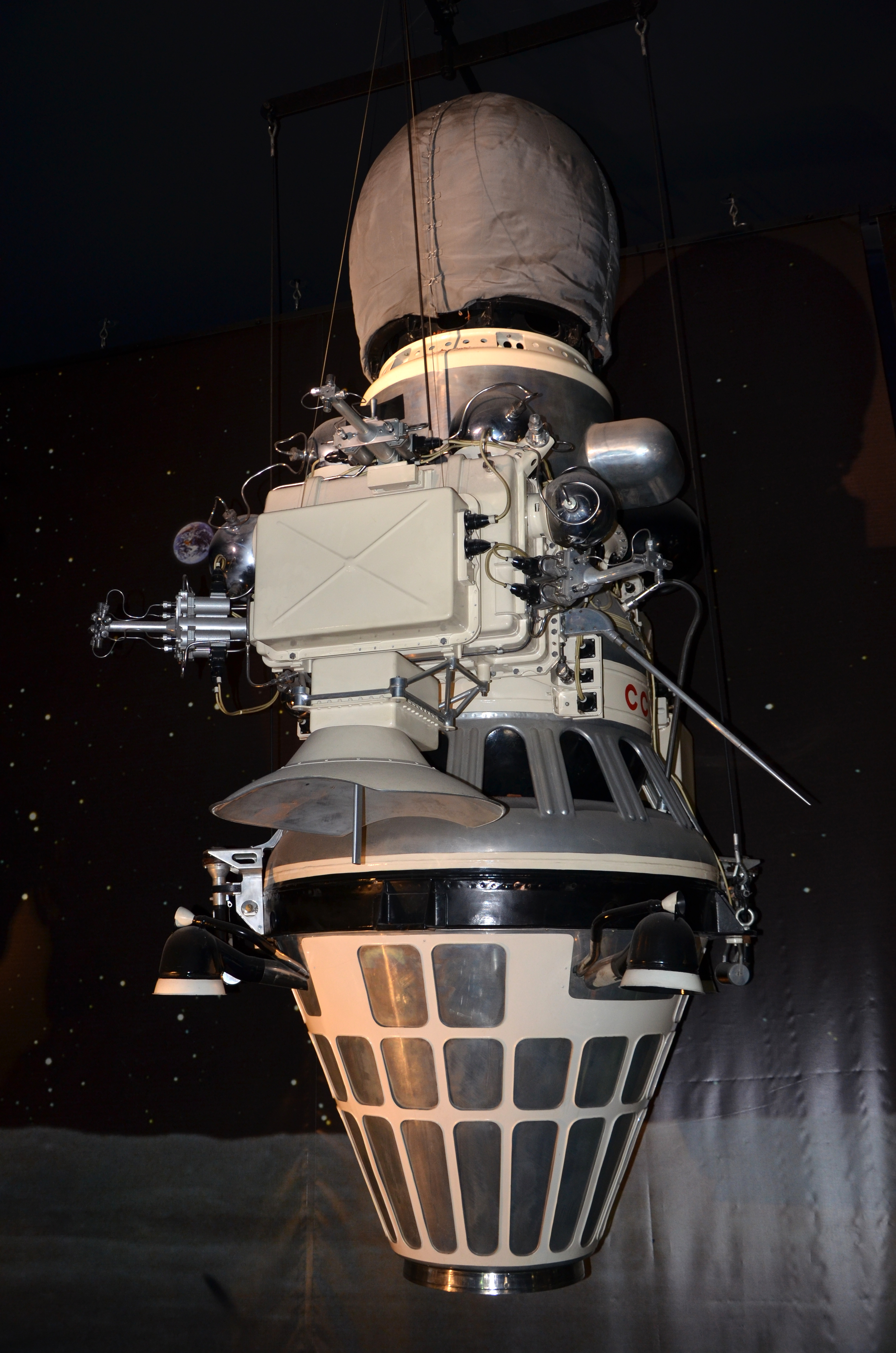
- Kosmos 60 is identical in design with Luna 9
- Mission type: Lunar lander
- Operator: Soviet space program
- COSPAR ID: 1965-018A
- SATCAT no.: 1246
- Mission duration: 5 days

Spacecraft properties
- Spacecraft type: Ye-6
- Manufacturer: OKB-1
- Launch mass: 6530 kg
- Dry mass: 1470 kg

Start of mission
- Launch date: 12 March 1965; 09:25:31 GMT
- Rocket: Molniya 8K78
- Launch site: Baikonur 1/5
- Contractor: OKB-1

End of mission
- Disposal: Launch failure
- Decay date: 17 March 1965

Orbital parameters
- Reference system: Geocentric
- Regime: Low Earth
- Perigee altitude: 195 km
- Apogee altitude: 248 km
- Inclination: 64.7°
- Period: 89.1 minutes
- Epoch: 12 March 1965

Kosmos 60 (Russian: Космос 60 meaning Cosmos 60) was an E-6 No.9 probe (Ye-6 series), launched by the Soviet Union. It was the sixth attempt at a lunar soft-landing mission, with a design similar to that of Luna 4.

Kosmos 60 was launched by a Molniya 8K78 rocket, serial number G15000-24, flying from Site 1/5 at the Baikonur Cosmodrome. The launch took place at 09:25:31 GMT. The spacecraft achieved a low Earth orbit, with a perigee of 195 kilometres (121 mi), an apogee of 248 kilometres (154 mi), an inclination of 64.7°, and an orbital period of 89.1 minutes, but failed to leave orbit for its journey to the Moon due to a failure when the Blok L upper stage failed to fire for the trans-lunar injection burn. Instead, the spacecraft remained stranded in Earth orbit. A later investigation indicated that there might have been a short circuit in the electric converter within the control system of the spacecraft (which also controlled the Blok L stage) preventing engine ignition. It had an on-orbit mass of 1,470 kilograms (3,240 lb). The satellite reentered the Earth's atmosphere on 17 March 1965.

Kosmos 60 carried two instruments: an imaging system and the SBM-10 radiation detector.
