= Luna E-6 No.2 =

Soviet lunar lander that failed to achieve planned orbit

E-6 No.2
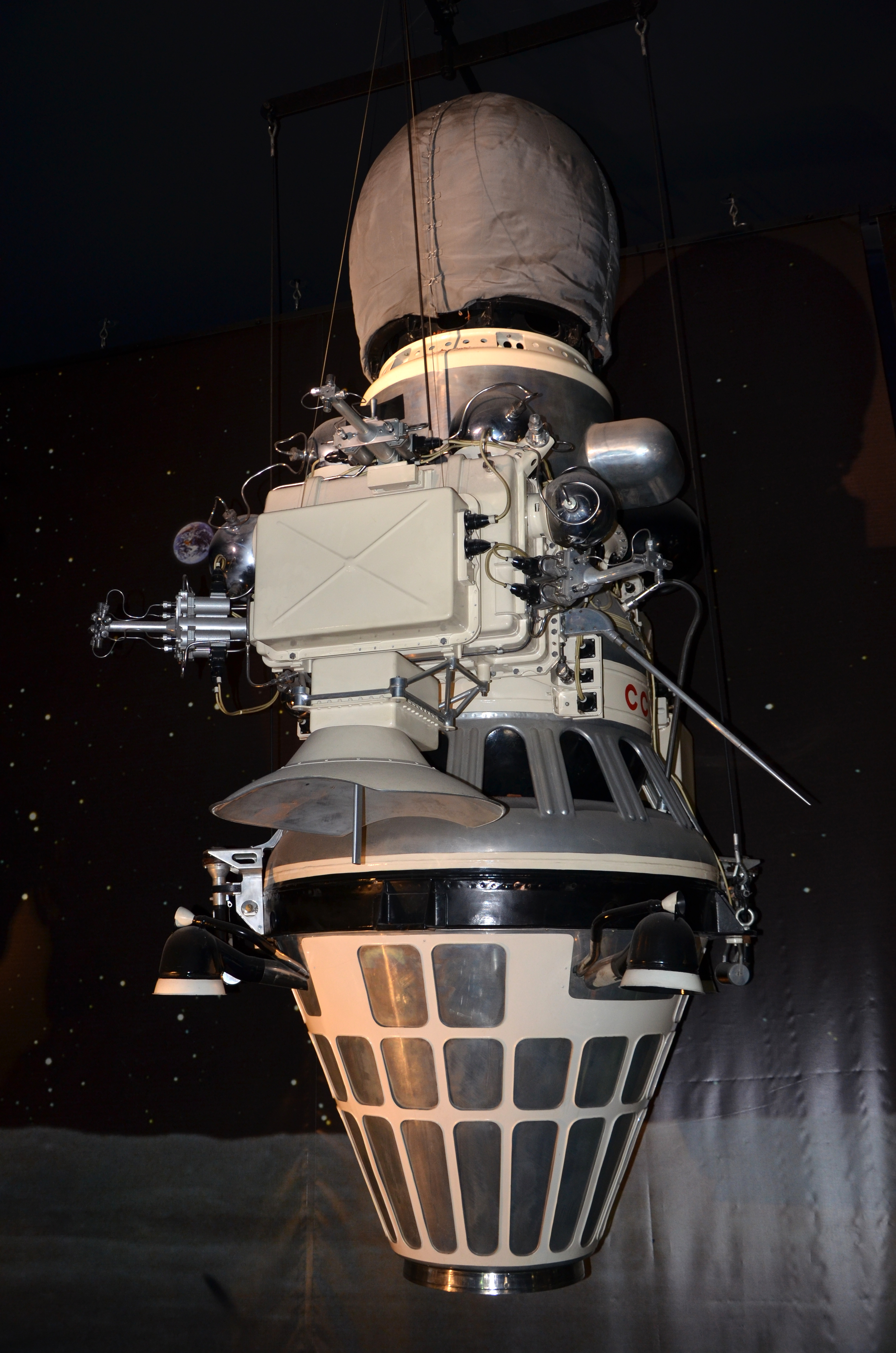
- Mission type: Lunar lander
- Operator: Soviet space program
- COSPAR ID: 1963-001B
- SATCAT no.: 522
- Mission duration: Launch failure

Spacecraft properties
- Spacecraft type: Ye-6
- Manufacturer: OKB-1
- Launch mass: 1,500 kilograms (3,300 lb)

Start of mission
- Launch date: 4 January 1963, 08:49 UTC
- Rocket: Molniya-L 8K78L s/n T103-09
- Launch site: Baikonur 1/5

End of mission
- Decay date: 11 January 1963

Orbital parameters
- Reference system: Geocentric
- Regime: Low Earth (achieved); Heliocentric (intended)
- Perigee altitude: 178 kilometres (111 mi)
- Apogee altitude: 194 kilometres (121 mi)
- Inclination: 64.7 degrees
- Period: 88.21 minutes
- Epoch: 11 January 1963

Luna E-6 No.2, also identified as No.1, and sometimes known in the West as Sputnik 25, was a Soviet spacecraft which launched in 1963, but was placed into a useless orbit due to a problem with the upper stage of the rocket that launched it. It was a 1,500-kilogram (3,300 lb) Luna Ye-6 spacecraft, the first of twelve to be launched. It was intended to be the first spacecraft to perform a soft landing on the Moon, a goal which would eventually be accomplished by the final Ye-6 spacecraft, Luna 9.

There was a pause of almost three years between the last Luna E-3 attempts in 1960, both of which ended in failure, and the first E-6 launches. The crowded Soviet space schedule meant that no resources for lunar missions were available and plans for more advanced second-generation probes were delayed, especially as the goal of a soft landing on the Moon was a difficult one that many engineers were hesitant to tackle. The 8K72 booster used for the first generation Luna probes could only deliver 325 kg (716 pounds) to the Moon on an inaccurate direct ascent trajectory, and the E-6 probe would weigh a minimum of 1,500 kg (3,306 pounds) so it would require the new, more powerful 8K78 booster developed for the planetary missions, which also allowed a much more accurate parking orbit launch. As a further weight saving measure, the control system for the entire launch vehicle would be integrated into the probe itself. But the 8K78 had so far not accumulated any better launch record than the 8K72 and of ten 8K78 launches as 1962 ended, only two had not experienced a malfunction. Experience had shown that a given rocket or missile had to fly at least 20 times before the R&D phase was over and it could be considered operational. The first E-6 probe was only completed and shipped to Baikonur in December 1962 and stacked on the booster, vehicle T103-09. Its estimated chance of success was about 10%.

Luna E-6 No.2 was launched at 08:49 UTC on 4 January 1963, atop a Molniya-L 8K78L carrier rocket, flying from Site 1/5 at the Baikonur Cosmodrome. The booster performed perfectly through orbital injection but there was no indication of Blok L start, which was supposed to take place while the stage was over the Gulf of Guinea, out of range of Soviet tracking stations. It was not clear why this happened, but one theory that was advanced held that leaking LOX during the coasting phase had caused an explosion when the engine was started. A tracking ship with a telemetry decoder hastily departed Odessa for the Gulf of Guinea. Data received from the Blok L determined that the engine did not receive the start commands from the control system. It was eventually concluded that the failure lay in failures of the carbonized brushes in the PT-500 converter inside the instrument compartment, which was filled with nitrogen and could cause the brushes to dry out. Ground testing was unable to replicate the exact in-flight environment but it was decided to add a small amount of water and oxygen to the container to keep the brushes slightly moistened. It remained in low Earth orbit until it decayed on 11 January 1963. It was the first spacecraft to be launched in 1963, and consequently the first to be assigned an International Designator, under the new system which had been introduced at the start of the year.

The spacecraft consisted of a cylindrical section containing rockets and fuel for maneuvering, attitude control and landing, as well as radio transmitters, and a 100-kilogram (220 lb) instrumented probe, which would have been ejected onto the surface after the spacecraft landed, carrying a camera and devices to measure radiation. It was intended to return data on the mechanical characteristics of the lunar surface, the hazards presented by the topology — such as craters, rocks, and other obstructions — and radiation, in preparation for future crewed landings.

The designations Sputnik 33, and later Sputnik 25 were used by the United States Naval Space Command to identify the spacecraft in its Satellite Situation Summary documents, since the Soviet Union did not release the internal designations of its spacecraft at that time, and had not assigned it an official name due to its failure to depart geocentric orbit.
