= Luna E-8 No.201 =

Soviet space probe (Luna 1969A)

E-8 No.201
- Mission type: Lunar lander
- Operator: Soviet space program
- Mission duration: Failed to orbit

Spacecraft properties
- Spacecraft type: E-8
- Manufacturer: NPO Lavochkin
- Launch mass: 5,590 kg (12,320 lb)

Start of mission
- Launch date: 19 February 1969, 06:48:15 UTC
- Rocket: Proton-K/D s/n 239-01
- Launch site: Baikonur 81/24

Luna E-8 No.201, also known as Luna Ye-8 No.201, and sometimes identified by NASA as Luna 1969A, was a Soviet spacecraft which was lost in a launch failure in 1969. It was a 5,590 kilograms (12,320 lb) Luna E-8 spacecraft, the first of three to be launched. It was intended to perform a soft landing on the Moon, in order to deploy a Lunokhod rover onto the surface. It carried the Lunokhod No.201 rover.

== Launch ==
Luna E-8 No.201 was launched at 06:48:15 UTC on 19 February 1969 atop a Proton-K 8K78K carrier rocket with a Blok D upper stage, flying from Baikonur Cosmodrome Site 81/24. The payload shroud collapsed at T+51 seconds as the booster was passing through the point of maximum aerodynamic pressure and debris struck the Proton's external N_{2}O_{4} tanks at high speed, puncturing them and allowing oxidizer to spill out and ignite on contact with the engine exhaust, resulting in the explosion of the first stage. The upper stages were blasted free and eventually impacted the ground. It was determined that the failure was due to a design flaw in the untested new payload shroud developed for the launch. The Russian documentary Project E-8 includes a film clip of the ill-fated launch. Prior to the release of information about its mission, NASA correctly identified that it had been an attempt to deploy a rover onto the lunar surface.
