= Luna 12 =

Soviet lunar orbiter

- Mission type: Lunar orbiter
- Operator: Soviet space program
- COSPAR ID: 1966-094A
- SATCAT no.: 02508
- Mission duration: 89 days

Spacecraft properties
- Spacecraft type: E-6LF
- Manufacturer: GSMZ Lavochkin
- Launch mass: 1,640 kilograms (3,620 lb)

Start of mission
- Launch date: October 22, 1966, 08:42:26 UTC
- Rocket: Molniya-M 8K78M
- Launch site: Baikonur 31/6

End of mission
- Last contact: January 19, 1967

Orbital parameters
- Reference system: Selenocentric
- Semi-major axis: 2,404.5 kilometres (1,494.1 mi)
- Eccentricity: 0.31
- Periselene altitude: 1,871 kilometres (1,163 mi)
- Aposelene altitude: 2,938 kilometres (1,826 mi)
- Inclination: 10 degrees
- Period: 205 minutes

Lunar orbiter
- Orbital insertion: October 25, 1966, 20:45 UTC
- Orbits: 602

Luna 12 (E-6LF series) was an uncrewed space mission of the Luna program, also called Lunik 12.

== Overview ==
Luna 12 was launched towards the Moon onboard a Molniya-M and achieved lunar orbit on October 25, 1966. The spacecraft was equipped with a television system that obtained and transmitted photographs of the lunar surface. The photographs contained 1100 scan lines with a maximum resolution of 14.9-19.8 m. Pictures of the lunar surface were returned on October 27, 1966. The number of photographs is not known. Radio transmissions from Luna 12 ceased on January 19, 1967, after 602 lunar orbits and 302 radio transmissions.

Luna 12 was launched to complete the mission that Luna 11 had failed to accomplish—take high-resolution photos of the Moon's surface from lunar orbit. Luna 12 reached the Moon on October 25, 1966, and entered a 133 x 1,200-kilometer orbit. The Soviet press released the first photos taken of the surface on October 29—pictures that showed the Sea of Rains and the Aristarchus crater. Resolution was as high as 15 to 20 meters. Film was developed, fixed, dried automatically, and scanned for transmission to Earth. No further photos were ever released. After completing its main imaging mission, Luna 12 was put into a spin-stabilized roll to carry out its scientific mission, which was successfully fulfilled.

Luna 12 was the first soviet probe where deliberate steps were taken to prevent interception of its signals by Jodrell Bank Observatory. When the probe was in the field of view of the observatory it began to switch its signals between two different frequencies, something Jodrell Bank was not able to follow.

== Legacy and status ==
On January 21, 1967, the Soviet news agency TASS announced that Luna 12 had completed its mission, breaking contact with ground stations.
