= Rover (space exploration) =

Planetary surface exploration vehicle

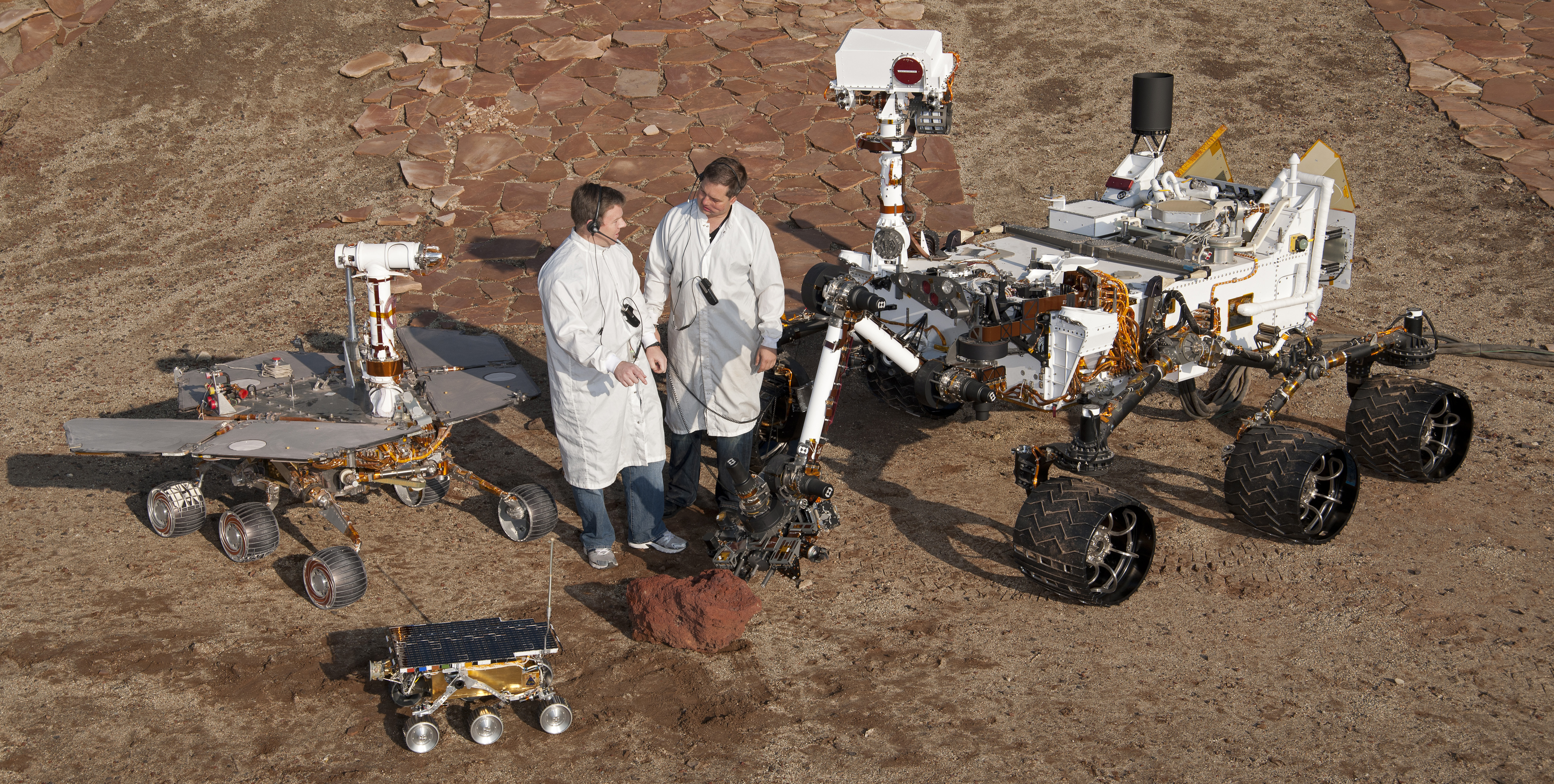
Three different Mars rover designs: Sojourner, MER and Curiosity

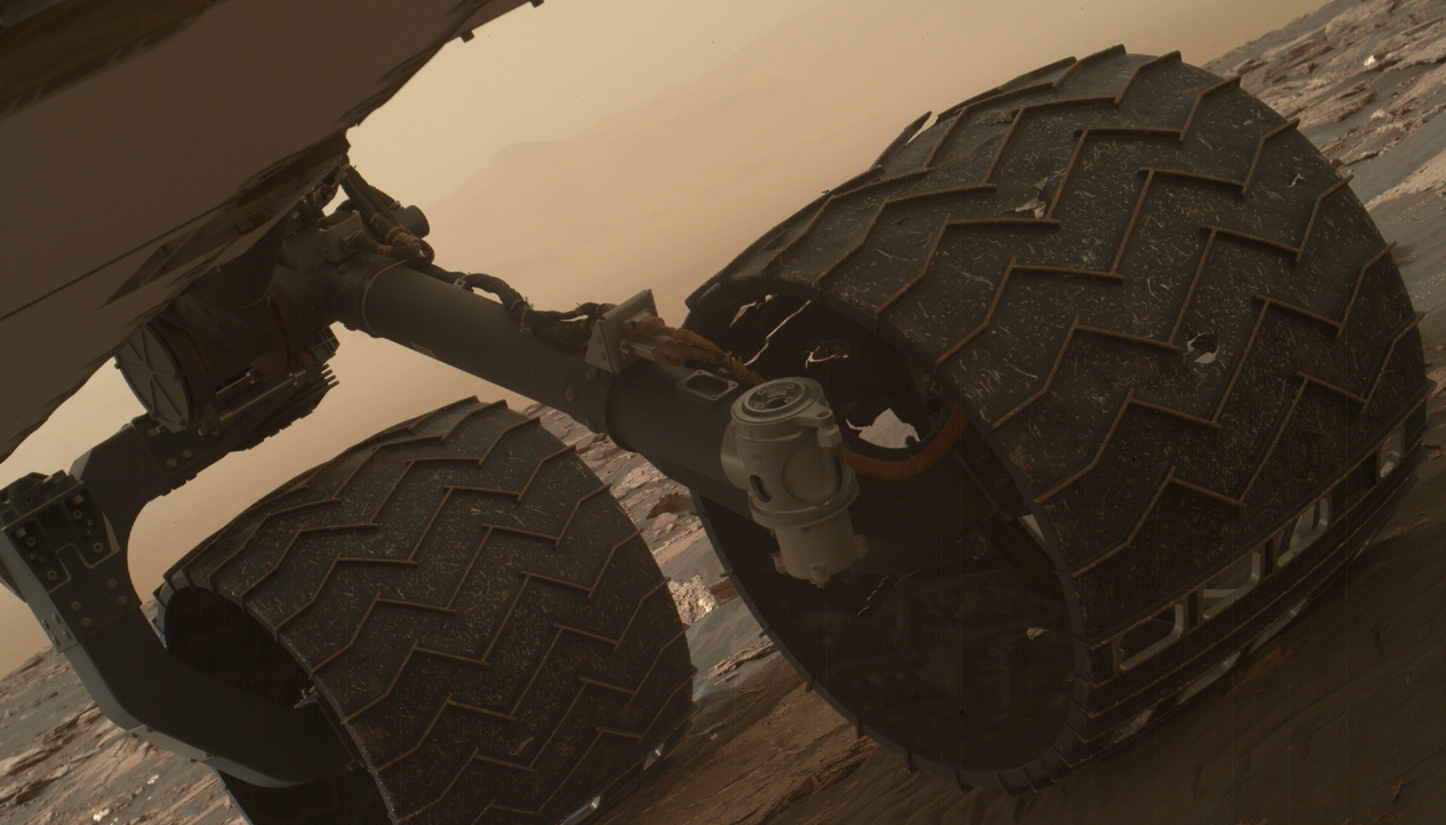
Curiosity's wheels on Mars, 2017

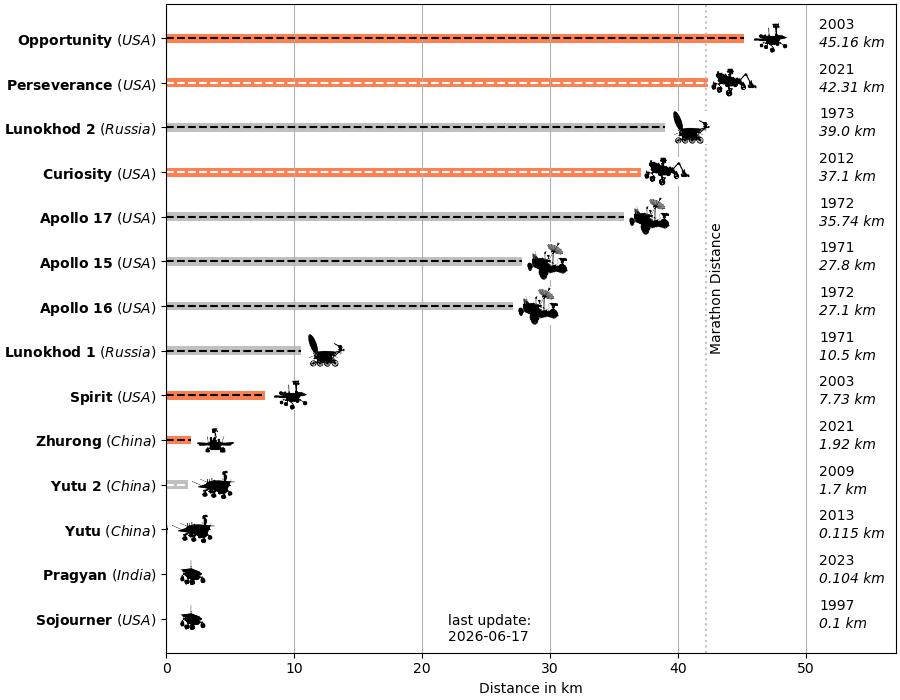
Comparison of distances driven by various wheeled vehicles on the surface of the Moon and Mars

A rover (or sometimes planetary rover) is a planetary surface exploration machine designed to move over the rough surface of a planet or other planetary-mass celestial bodies. Some rovers have been designed as land vehicles to transport members of a human spaceflight crew; others have been partially or fully autonomous robots.

Rovers typically land on a planet other than Earth or a moon via a lander-style spacecraft, tasked to move around and collect information about the terrain, and to take crust samples such as dust, soil, rocks and even liquids. They are essential astrogeology tools for space exploration.

== Features ==
Rovers arrive on spacecraft and are used in conditions very distinct from those on the Earth, which makes some demands on their design.

=== Reliability ===
Rovers have to withstand high levels of acceleration, high and low temperatures, pressure, dust, corrosion, cosmic rays, remaining functional without repair for a needed period of time.

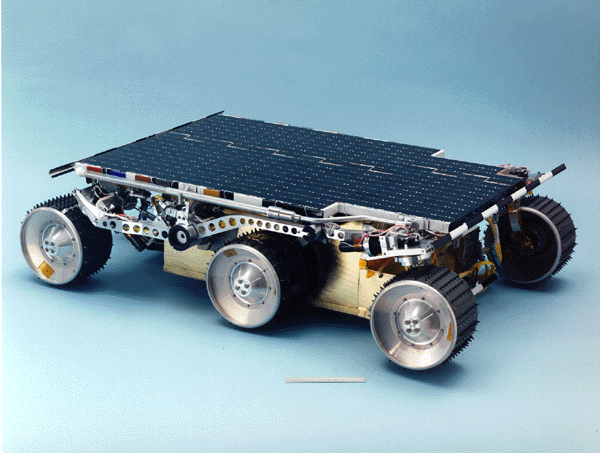
Mars rover Sojourner in cruise configuration

=== Autonomy ===
Rovers which land on celestial bodies far from the Earth, such as the Mars Exploration Rovers, cannot be remotely controlled in real-time since the speed at which radio signals travel is far too slow for real-time or near-real-time communication. For example, sending a signal from Mars to Earth takes between 3 and 21 minutes. These rovers are thus capable of operating autonomously with little assistance from ground control as far as navigation and data acquisition are concerned, although they still require human input for identifying promising targets in the distance to which to drive, and determining how to position itself to maximize solar energy. Giving a rover some rudimentary visual identification capabilities to make simple distinctions can allow engineers to speed up the reconnaissance. During the NASA Sample Return Robot Centennial Challenge, a rover, named Cataglyphis, successfully demonstrated autonomous navigation, decision-making, and sample detection, retrieval, and return capabilities.

=== Non-wheeled approaches ===
Other rover designs that do not use wheeled approaches are possible. Mechanisms that utilize "walking" on robotic legs, hopping, rolling, etc. are possible. For example, Stanford University researchers have proposed "Hedgehog", a small cube-shaped rover that can controllably hop—or even spin out of a sandy sinkhole by corkscrewing upward to escape—for surface exploration of low gravity celestial bodies.

== Past missions ==
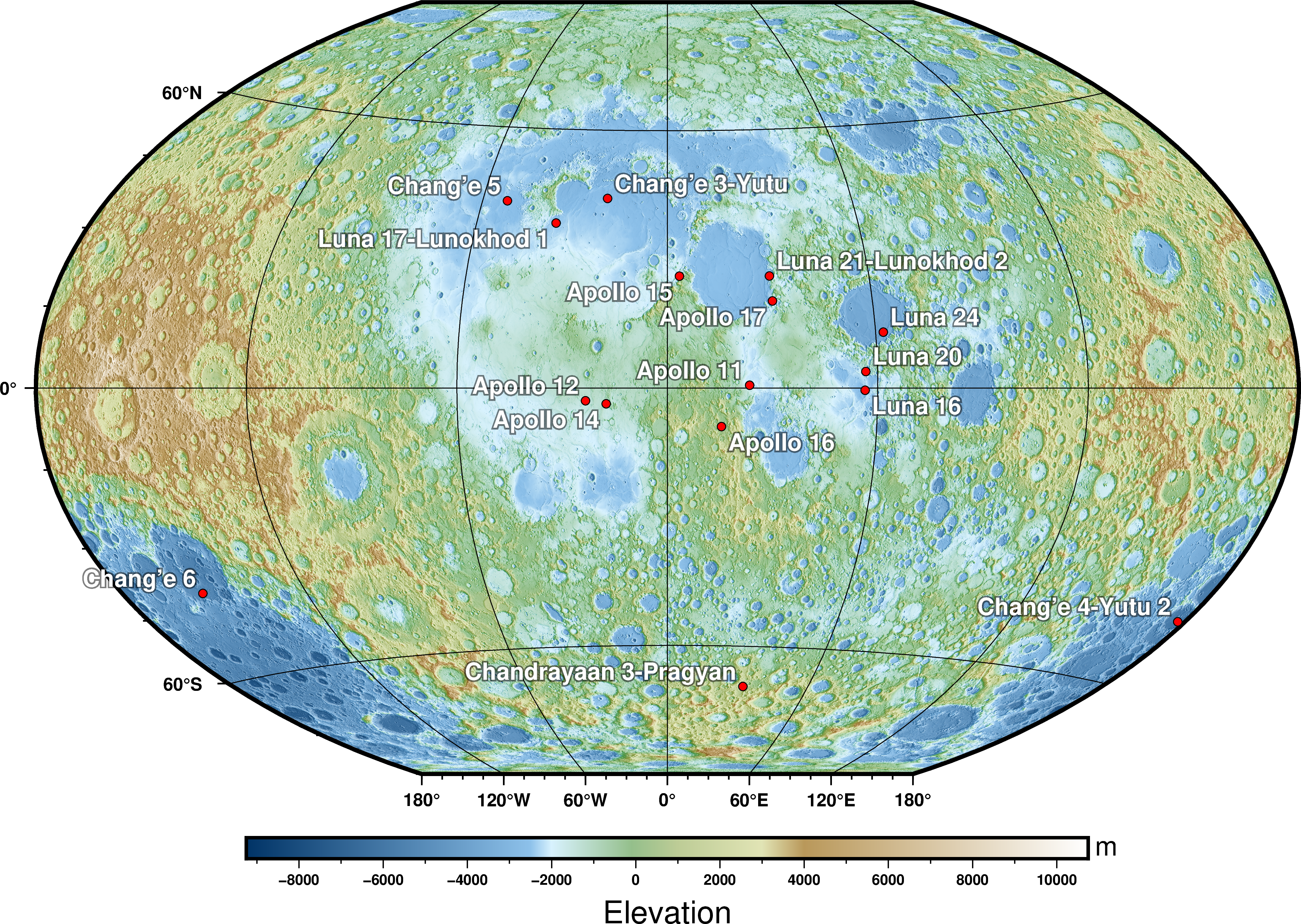
Landing sites of sample return and rover missions

=== Moon ===
==== Lunokhod 0 (No.201) ====
The Soviet rover was intended to be the first roving remote-controlled robot on the Moon, but crashed during a failed start of the launcher 19 February 1969.

==== Lunokhod 1 ====
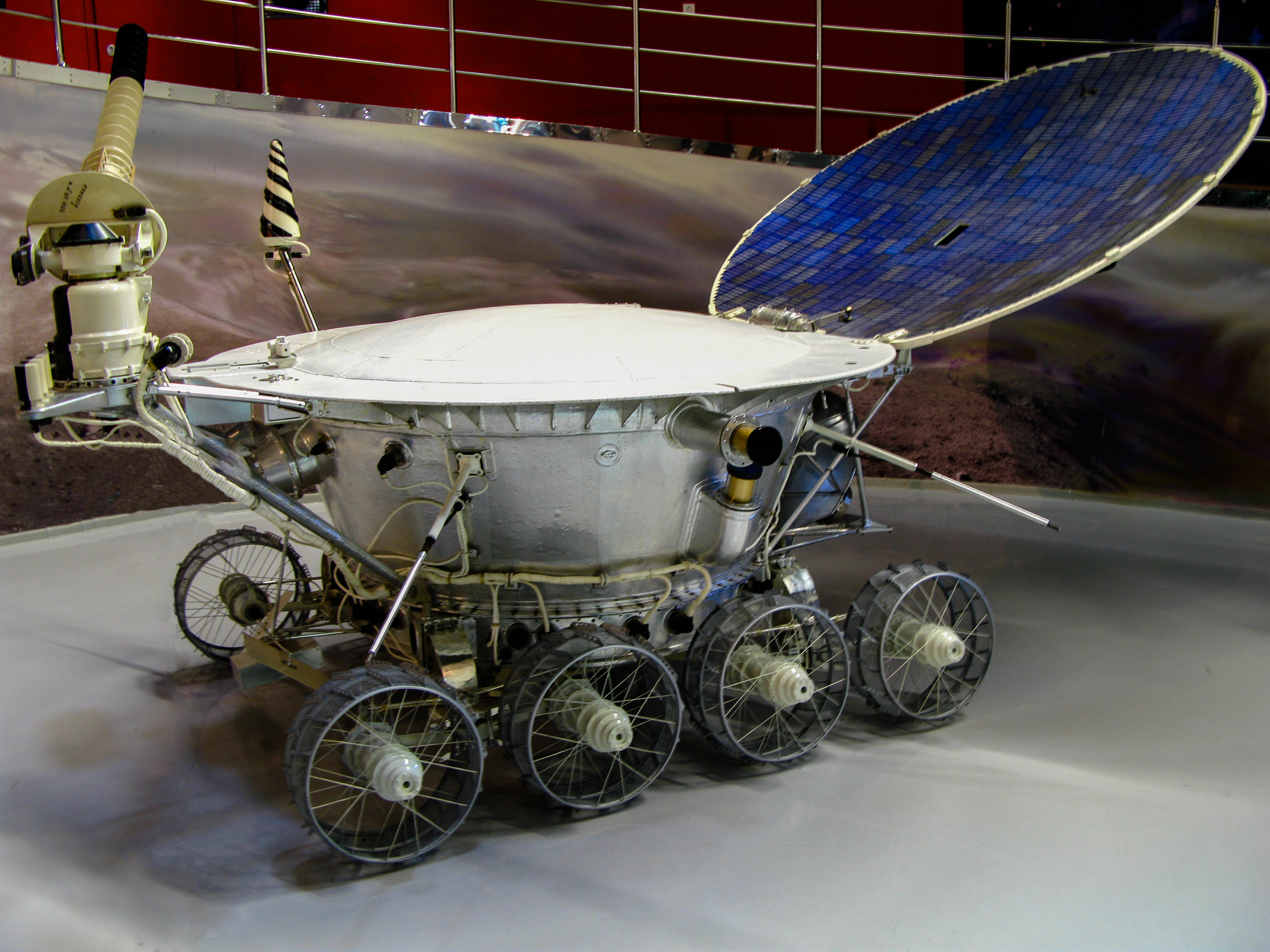
The Lunokhod 1 Lunar Rover

The Lunokhod 1 rover landed on the Moon in November 1970. It was the first roving remote-controlled robot to land on any celestial body. The Soviet Union launched Lunokhod 1 aboard the Luna 17 spacecraft on November 10, 1970, and it entered lunar orbit on November 15. The spacecraft soft-landed in the Sea of Rains region on November 17. The lander had dual ramps from which Lunokhod 1 could descend to the lunar surface, which it did at 06:28 UT. From November 17, 1970, to November 22, 1970, the rover drove 197 m, and during 10 communication sessions returned 14 close up pictures of the Moon and 12 panoramic views. It also analyzed the lunar soil. The last successful communications session with Lunokhod 1 was on September 14, 1971, having operated for 11 months.

==== Apollo Lunar Roving Vehicle ====
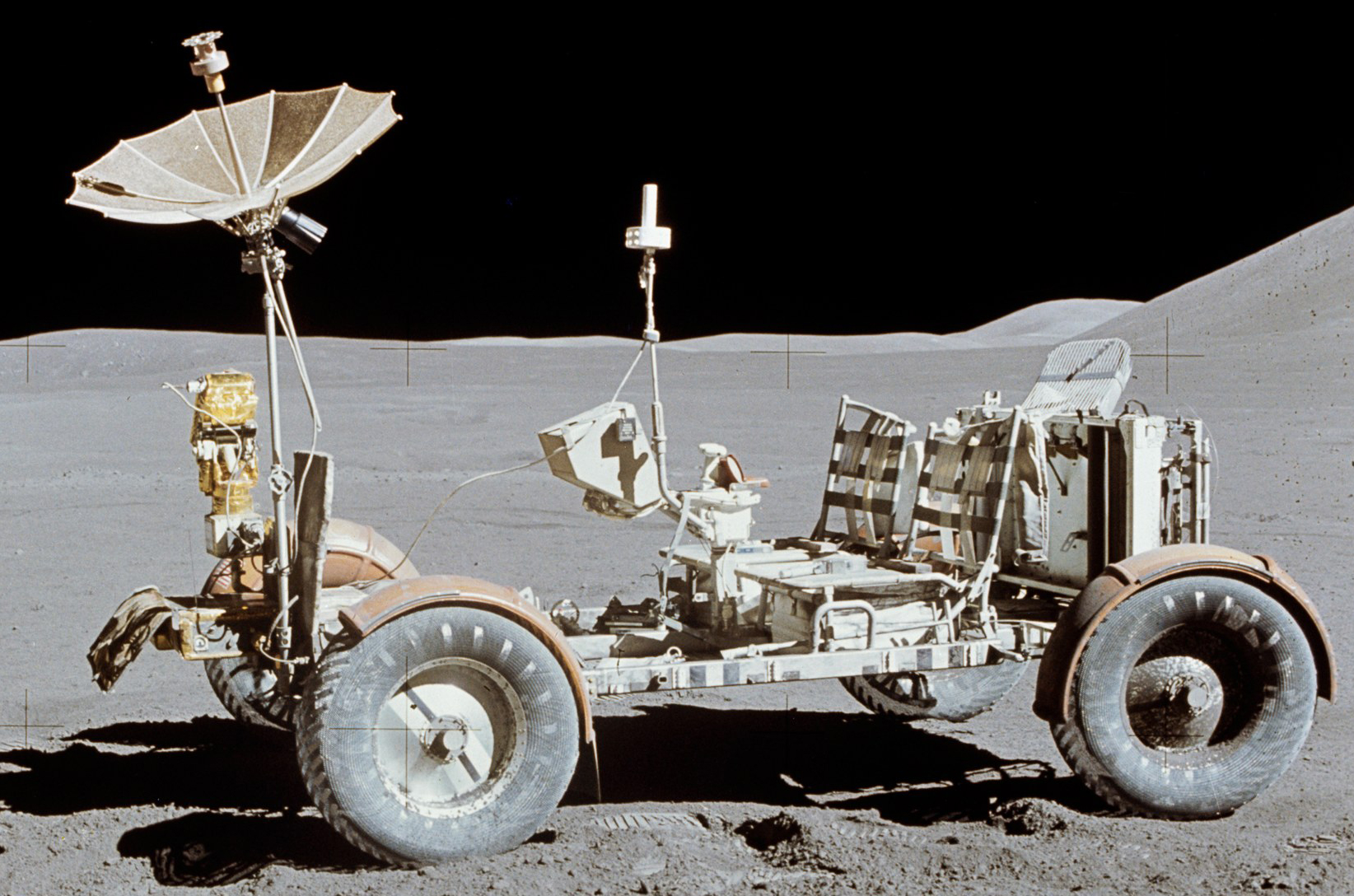
Apollo 15 Lunar Roving Vehicle

NASA included Lunar Roving Vehicles in three Apollo missions: Apollo 15 (which landed on the Moon July 30, 1971), Apollo 16 (which landed April 21, 1972), and Apollo 17 (which landed December 11, 1972).

==== Lunokhod 2 ====
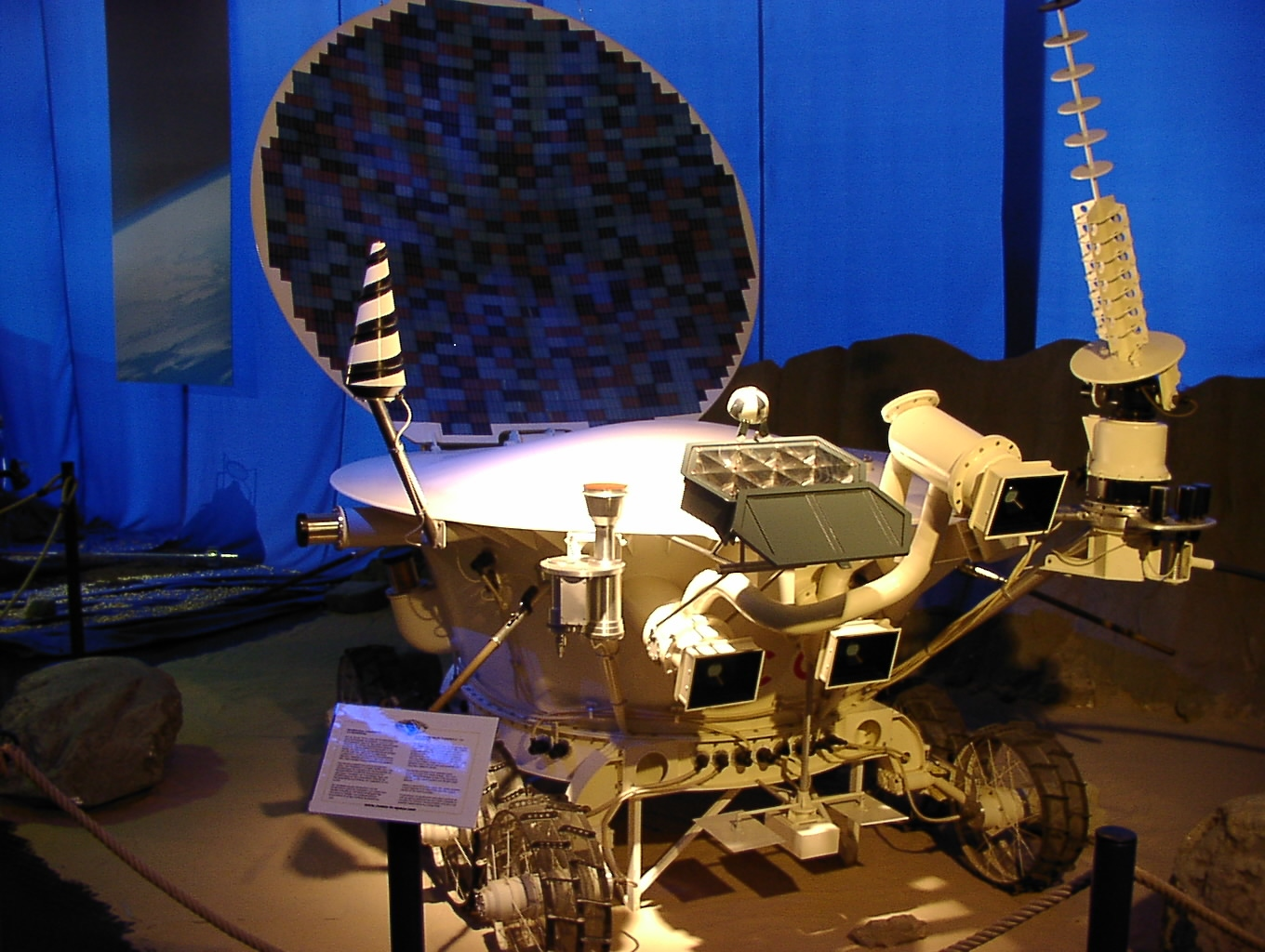
The Lunokhod 2 lunar rover

The Lunokhod 2 was the second of two uncrewed lunar rovers landed on the Moon by the Soviet Union as part of the Lunokhod program. The rover became operational on the Moon on January 16, 1973. It was the second roving remote-controlled robot to land on any celestial body. The Soviet Union launched Lunokhod 2 aboard the Luna 21 spacecraft on January 8, 1973, and the spacecraft soft-landed in the eastern edge of the Mare Serenitatis region on January 15, 1973. Lunokhod 2 descended from the lander's dual ramps to the lunar surface at 01:14 UT on January 16, 1973. Lunokhod 2 operated for about four months, covered 39 km (24 mi) of terrain, including hilly upland areas and rilles, and sent back 86 panoramic images and over 80,000 TV pictures. Based on wheel rotations Lunokhod 2 was thought to have covered 37 km (23 mi) but Russian scientists at the Moscow State University of Geodesy and Cartography (MIIGAiK) have revised that to an estimated distance of about 42.1–42.2 km (26.2–26.2 mi) based on Lunar Reconnaissance Orbiter (LRO) images of the lunar surface. Subsequent discussions with their American counterparts ended with an agreed-upon final distance of 39 km (24 mi), which has stuck since.

==== Lunokhod 3 ====
The Soviet rover was intended to be the third roving remote-controlled robot on the Moon in 1977. The mission was canceled due to lack of launcher availability and funding, although the rover was built.

==== Yutu ====
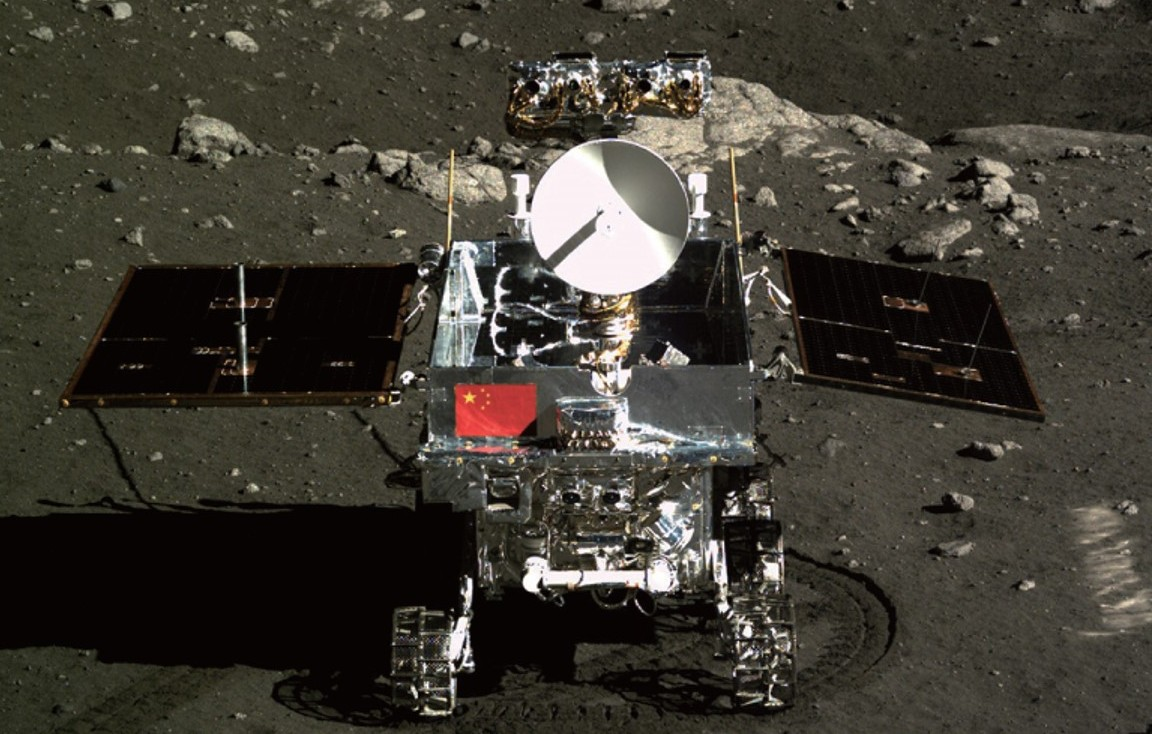
Yutu rover on lunar surface

Chang'e 3 is a Chinese Moon mission that includes a robotic rover Yutu, named after the pet rabbit of Chang'e, the goddess of the Moon in Chinese mythology. Launched in 2013 with the Chang'e 3 mission, it is China's first lunar rover, the first soft landing on the Moon since 1976 and the first rover to operate there since the Soviet Lunokhod 2 ceased operations on 11 May 1973. It was deployed on the Moon on December 14, 2013, and the rover encountered operational difficulties toward the end of the second lunar day after surviving and recovering successfully the first 14-day lunar night (about a month on the Moon), and was unable to move after the end of the second lunar night, though it continued to gather useful information for some months afterward. In October 2015, Yutu set the record for the longest operational period for a rover on the Moon. On 31 July 2016, Yutu ceased to operate after a total of 31 months, well beyond its original expected lifespan of three months.

==== Pragyan (Chandrayaan-2 rover) ====
Chandrayaan-2 was the second lunar mission by India, consisting of a lunar orbiter, a lander named Vikram, and a rover named Pragyan. The rover weighing 27 kg, had six wheels and was to be operated on solar power. Launched on 22 July 2019, the mission entered lunar orbit on August 20. Pragyan was destroyed along with its lander, Vikram, when it crash-landed on the Moon on 6 September 2019 and never got the chance to deploy.

==== Rashid ====
Rashid was a lunar rover built by MBRSC to be launched onboard Ispace's lander called Hakuto-R. The rover was launched in November 2022, but was destroyed as the lander crash landed in April 2023. It was equipped with two high-resolution cameras, a microscopic camera to capture small details, and a thermal imaging camera. The rover carried a Langmuir probe, designed to study the Moon's plasma and will attempt to explain why Moon dust is so sticky.

==== SORA-Q (Hakuto-R Mission 1 rover) ====
Takara Tomy, JAXA and Doshisha University made a rover to be launched onboard Ispace's lander called Hakuto-R. It was launched in 2022, but was destroyed as the lander crash landed in April 2023.

==== Pragyan (Chandrayaan-3 rover) ====
Chandrayaan-3 is a mission by India's space agency (ISRO), consisting of a lunar lander and the Pragyan rover. It was a re-attempt to demonstrate soft landing, following the failure of Chandrayaan-2's Vikram lander. It was launched on 14 July 2023 on the LVM-3 launch vehicle and has soft landed near south pole of the Moon August 23 at 6.04 PM IST. The 26 kg 6 wheeled rover Pragyan has descend from lander belly, on to the Moon's surface, using one of its side panels as a ramp. The rover will carry out in-situ chemical analysis of the lunar surface during its course of its mobility. The rover was deployed on 23 August and was put into sleep mode after completing all its objectives on 3 September. It later died during that lunar night.

==== Peregrine Mission One ====
Peregrine launched towards the Moon on 8 January 2024, taking with it 5 Colmena rovers and a Iris rover. After separation from the launch vehicle a fault occurred preventing it from completing its mission. The spacecraft instead returned to Earth's atmosphere, where it disintegrated on 18 January.

==== SLIM rovers ====
The Smart Lander for Investigating Moon (SLIM) lander has two rovers onboard, Lunar Excursion Vehicle 1 (LEV-1) (hopper) and Lunar Excursion Vehicle 2 (LEV-2), or Sora-Q, a tiny rover developed by JAXA in joint cooperation with Tomy, Sony Group, and Doshisha University. The first rover has direct-to-Earth communication. The second rover is designed to change its shape to traverse around the landing site over a short lifespan of two hours. SLIM was launched on September 6, 2023, and reached lunar orbit on 25 December 2023. They two rovers were successfully deployed and landed separately from SLIM shortly before it own landing on 19 January 2024. LEV-1 conducted six hops on lunar surface and LEV-2 imaged SLIM lander on lunar surface.

==== Jinchan ====
The Chang'e 6 sample return mission carried a rover called Jinchan to conduct infrared spectroscopy of lunar surface. Jinchan was also used to image the Chang'e 6 lander on lunar surface.

==== IM-2 Athena Rovers ====
The IM-2 Athena lander carried a number of rovers to lunar surface, including MAPP LV1, Micro-Nova Gracie, the AstroAnt miniature rover and the Japanese Yaoki. The lander was intact after touchdown but resting on its side. The rovers were not deployed.

==== TENACIOUS ====
The Hakuto-R Mission 2 was developed by the Japanese company ispace and launched on 15 January 2025. It included a 5 kg (11 lb) rover called "TENACIOUS", designed and manufactured in Luxembourg, to be lowered to the lunar surface from the lander and explore the area around the landing site. During the lunar landing on 5 June 2025, the lander lost communications approximately 90 seconds before touchdown and crashed on the surface.

=== Mars ===
==== PrOP-M ====
The Soviet Mars 2 and Mars 3 landers each had a small 4.5 kg PrOP-M rover on board, which would have moved across the surface on skis while connected to the lander with a 15-meter umbilical. Two small metal rods were used for autonomous obstacle avoidance, as radio signals from Earth would have taken too long to drive the rovers using remote control. The rover was planned to be placed on the surface after landing by a manipulator arm and to move in the field of view of the television cameras and stop to make measurements every 1.5 meters. The rover tracks in the Martian soil would also have been recorded to determine material properties. Because of the crash landing of Mars 2 and the communication failure (15 seconds post landing) of Mars 3, neither rover was deployed.

==== Marsokhod ====
The Marsokhod was a Soviet rover (hybrid, with both controls telecommand and automatic) aimed at Mars, part of the Mars 4NM and scheduled to commence after 1973 (according to the plans of 1970). It was to be launched by a N1 rocket, which never flew successfully.

==== Sojourner ====
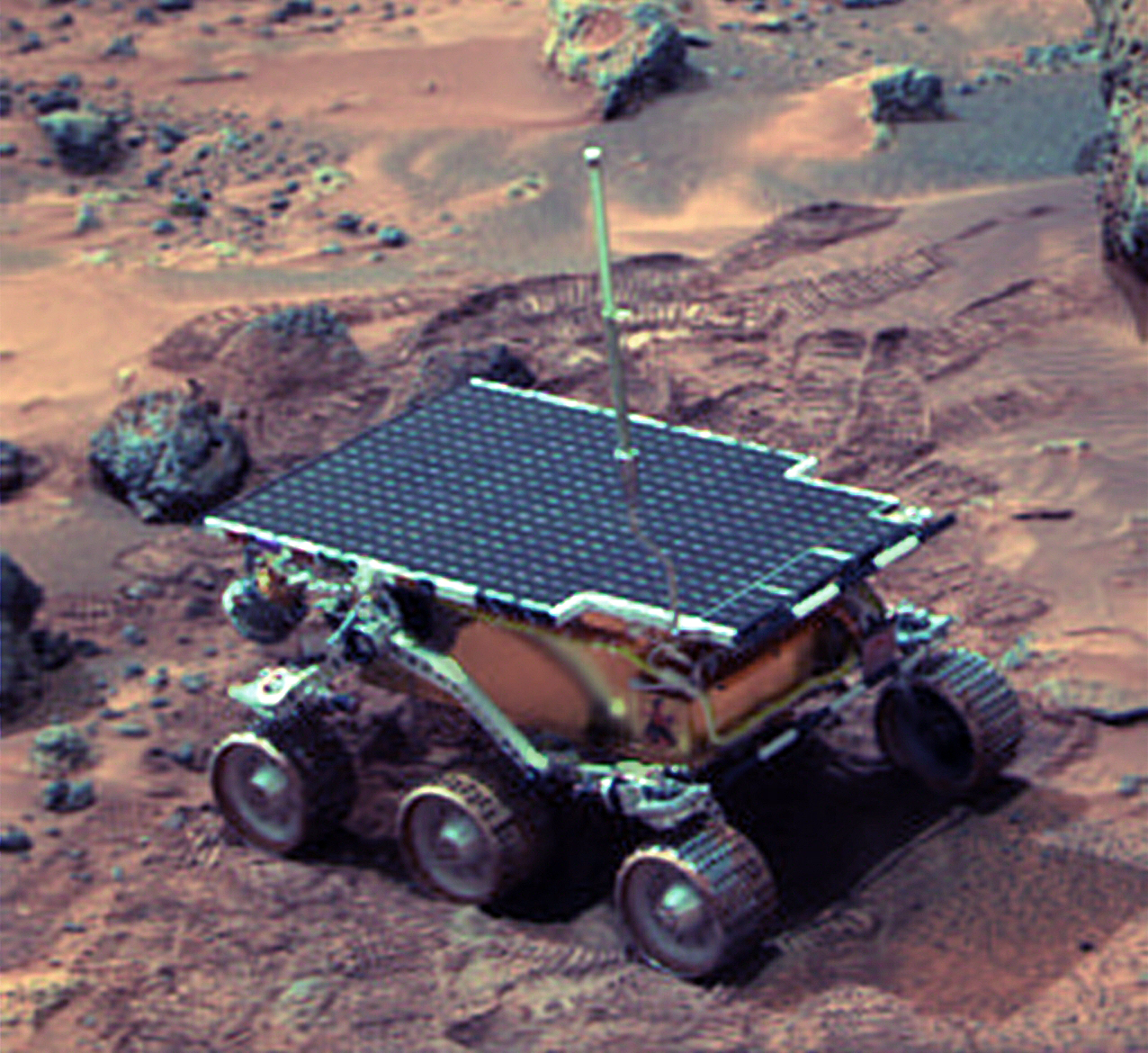
Sojourner on Mars in 1997

The Mars Pathfinder mission included Sojourner, the first rover to successfully deploy on another planet. NASA launched Mars Pathfinder on 4 December 1996; it landed on Mars in a region called Chryse Planitia on 4 July 1997. From its landing until the final data transmission on 27 September 1997, Mars Pathfinder returned 16,500 images from the lander and 550 images from Sojourner, as well as data from more than 15 chemical analyses of rocks and soil and extensive data on winds and other weather factors.

==== Beagle 2 ====
Beagle 2 was designed to explore Mars with a small "mole" (Planetary Undersurface Tool, or PLUTO), to be deployed by the arm. PLUTO had a compressed spring mechanism designed to enable it to move across the surface at a rate of 20 mm per second and to burrow into the ground, collecting a subsurface sample in a cavity in its tip. Beagle 2 failed while attempting to land on Mars in 2003.

==== Mars Exploration Rover Spirit ====
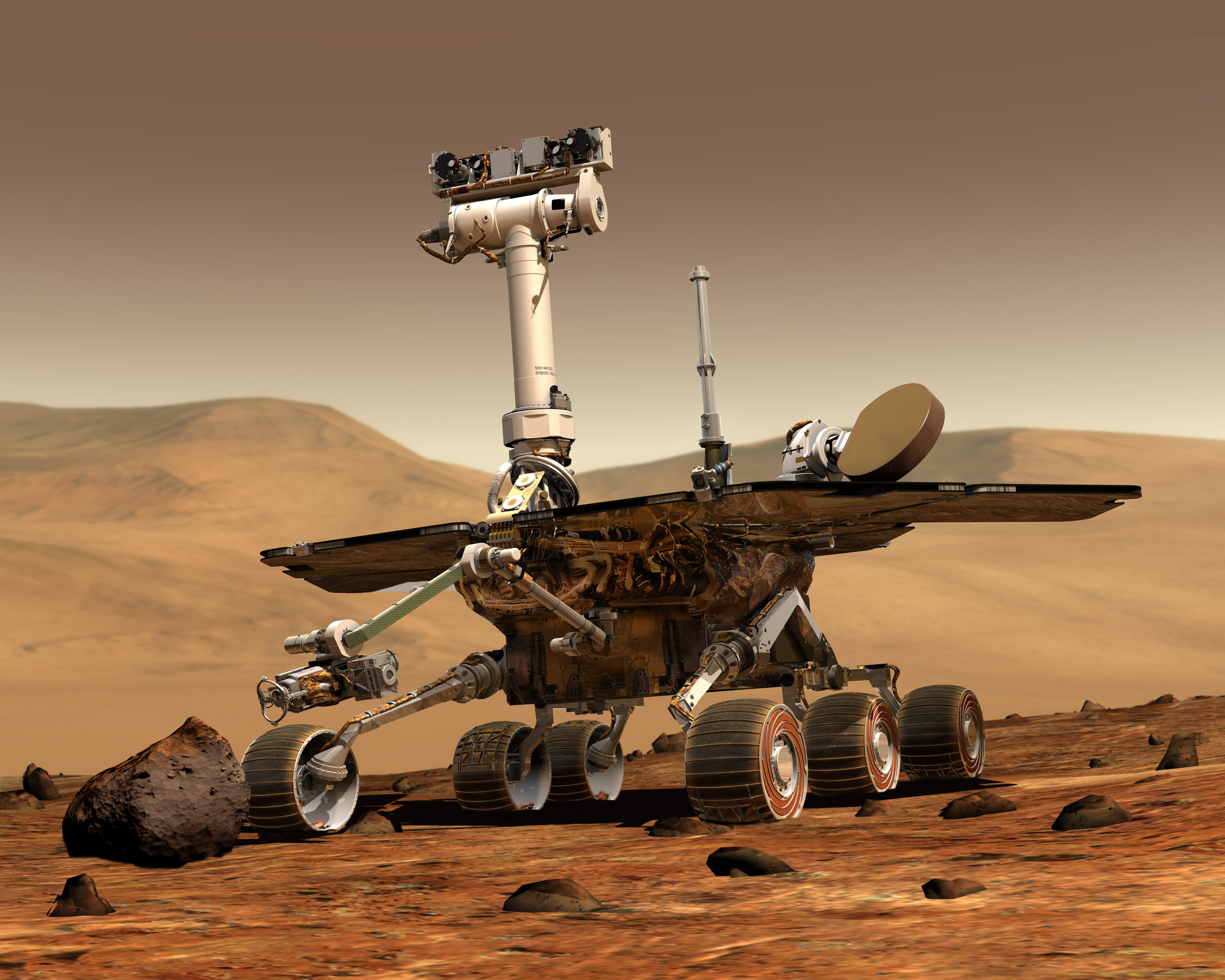
Mars Exploration Rover

Spirit was a robotic rover on Mars, active from 2004 to 2010. It was one of two rovers of NASA's ongoing Mars Exploration Rover mission. It landed successfully on Mars at 04:35 Ground UTC on January 4, 2004, three weeks before its twin, Opportunity (MER-B), landed on the other side of the planet. Its name was chosen through a NASA-sponsored student essay competition. The rover became stuck in late 2009, and its last communication with Earth was sent on March 22, 2010.

==== Mars Exploration Rover Opportunity ====
Opportunity was a robotic rover on the planet Mars, active from 2004 to early 2019. Launched from Earth on July 7, 2003, it landed on the Martian Meridiani Planum on January 25, 2004, at 05:05 Ground UTC (about 13:15 local time), three weeks after its twin Spirit (MER-A) touched down on the other side of the planet. On July 28, 2014, NASA announced that Opportunity, after having traveled over 40 km (25 mi) on the planet Mars, has set a new "off-world" record as the rover having driven the greatest distance, surpassing the previous record held by the Soviet Union's Lunokhod 2 rover that had traveled 39 km (24 mi).

==== Zhurong ====
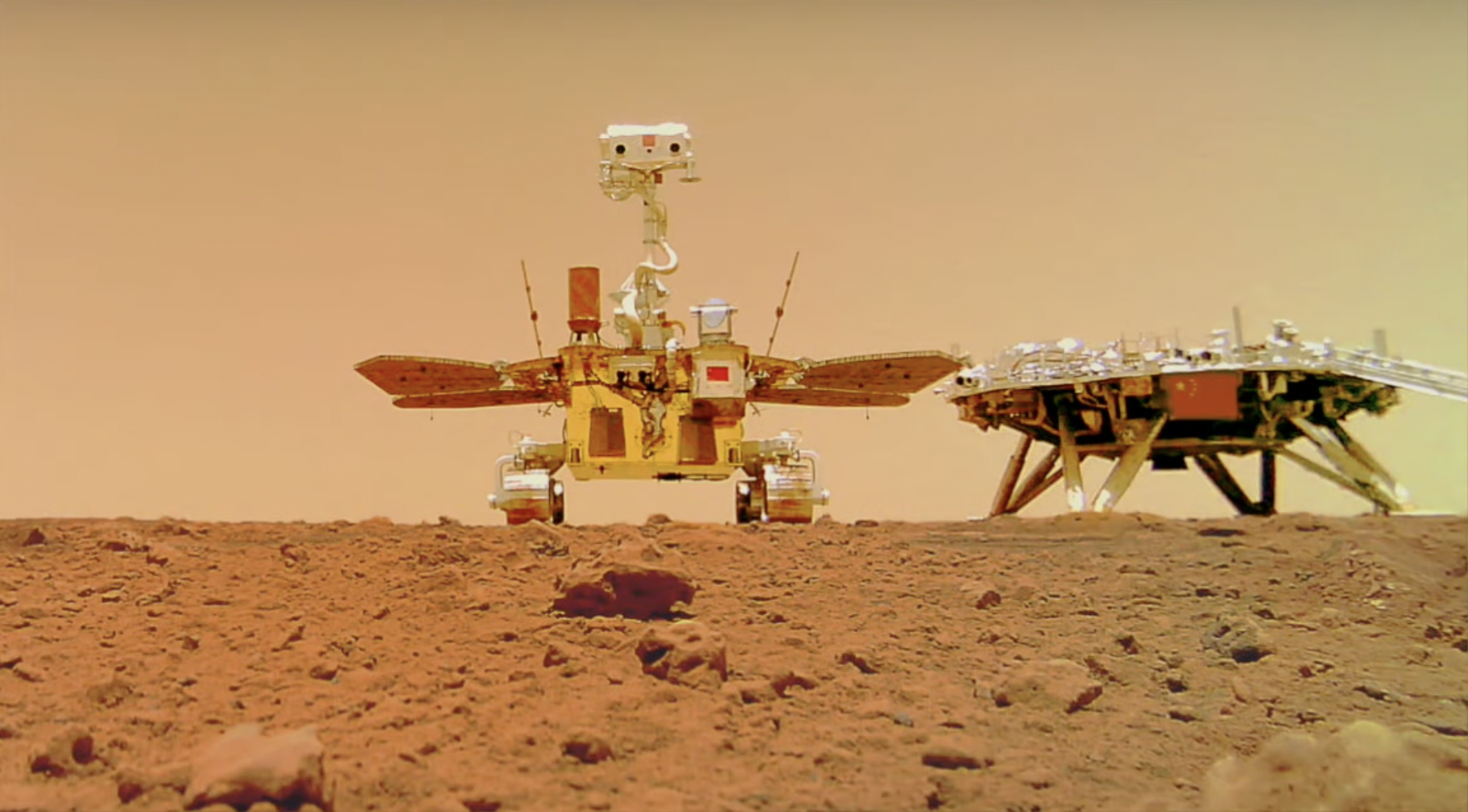
Zhurong selfie with lander, taken by the deployable Tianwen-1 remote camera.

Zhurong rover was a Chinese Mars rover operated by CNSA.It was launched from Wenchang by a Long March 5 carrier rocket on 23 July 2020, 23:18 UTC. It deployed successfully on Mars at 22 May 2021, 02:40 UTC. It was designed for 90sols (93 Earth days), and operated for 347sols (356.5 Earth days) and travelled 1.921Km/1.194Mi.The rover was deactivated on 20 May 2022 due to an approaching sandstorm and Martian winter, waiting to be self-reactivation during favorable condition. Zhurong was expected to reactivate in December 2022, but due to excessive dust accumulation on the solar panel, the rover could not wake itself. On 25 April 2023, chief designer Zhang Rongqiao indicated that the rover could be inactive "forever".

== Active rover missions ==
=== Mars Science Laboratory Rover Curiosity ===
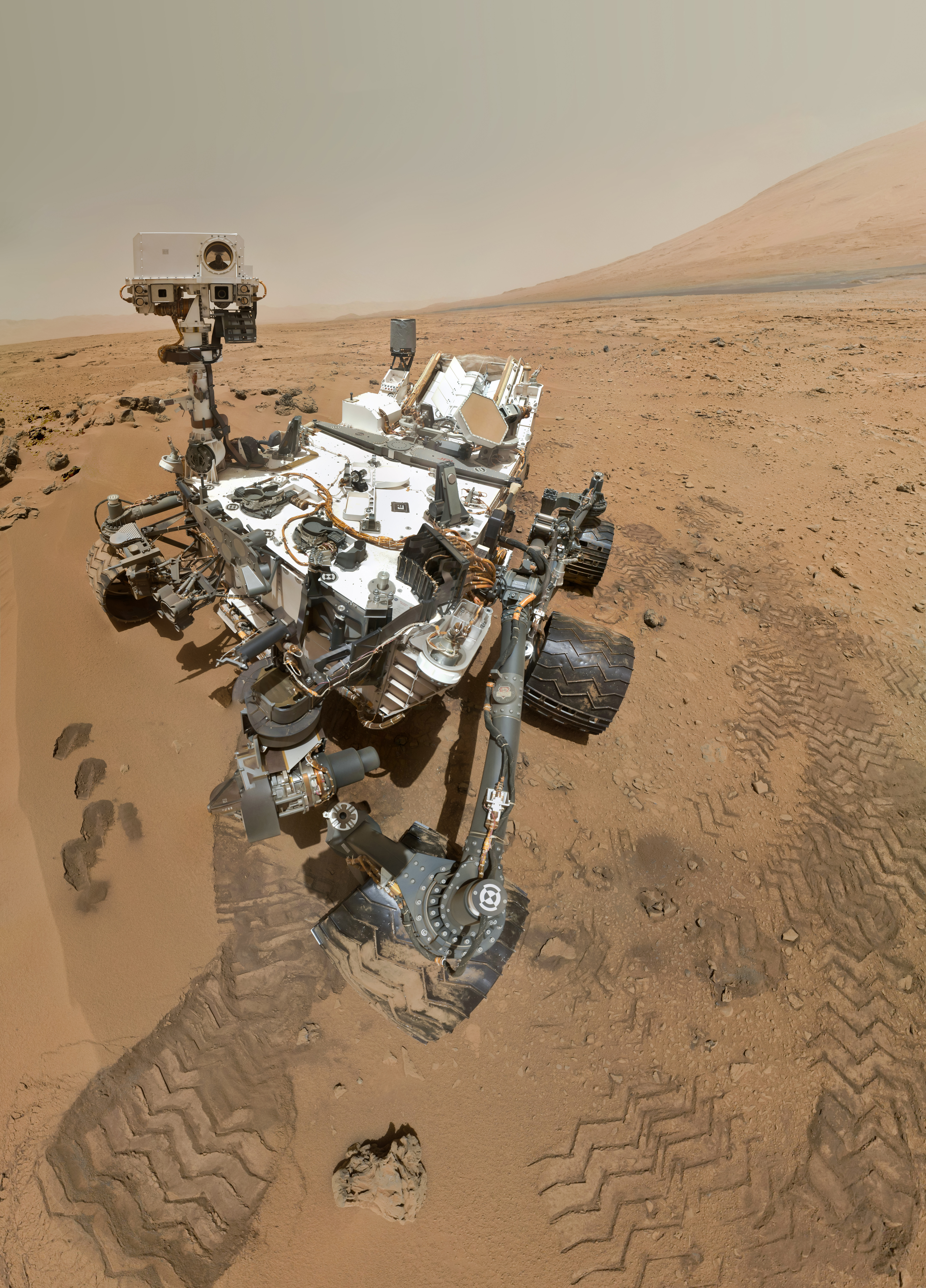
Mars Science Laboratory Curiosity rover

On 26 November 2011, NASA's Mars Science Laboratory mission was successfully launched for Mars. The mission successfully landed the robotic Curiosity rover on the surface of Mars in August 2012. The rover is currently helping to determine whether Mars could ever have supported life, and search for evidence of past or present life on Mars.

=== Mars 2020 Perseverance rover ===
NASA's Perseverance rover is a part of the Mars 2020 mission, launched in 2020 and landed on Mars on February 18, 2021. It is intended to investigate an astrobiologically relevant ancient environment on Mars, investigate its surface geological processes and history, including the assessment of its past habitability and potential for preservation of biosignatures within accessible geological materials.

=== Yutu-2 ===
Chinese Chang'e 4 mission launched 7 December 2018, landed and deployed rover 3 January 2019 on the far side of the Moon. It was the first ever rover that operates on the far side of the Moon.

In December 2019, Yutu 2 broke the lunar longevity record, previously held by the Soviet Union's Lunokhod 1 rover, which operated on the lunar surface for eleven lunar days (321 Earth days) and traversed a total distance of 10.54 km (6.55 mi).

In February 2020, Chinese astronomers reported, for the first time, a high-resolution image of a lunar ejecta sequence, and, as well, direct analysis of its internal architecture. These were based on observations made by the Lunar Penetrating Radar (LPR) on board the Yutu-2 rover while studying the far side of the Moon.

== Planned rover missions ==
=== ExoMars Rosalind Franklin ===
The European Space Agency (ESA) has designed and carried out early prototyping and testing of the Rosalind Franklin rover. As a result of Russia's invasion of Ukraine, ESA severed ties with Roscosmos and was left without a launch vehicle for this mission. The mission now plans to launch no earlier than (NET) 2028 with a landing around 2030.

=== LUPEX rover ===
A 350 kilogram rover is planned to be built by Mitsubishi Heavy Industries for the upcoming Indo-Japanese LUPEX mission.The rover would carry multiple instruments by JAXA and ISRO including a drill to collect sub-surface samples from a depth of 1.5 m (4 ft 11 in). It will land no later then 2028

=== Roo-ver ===
Roo-ver is Australia's first lunar rover funded by the Australian Space Agency (ASA). It's 20 kilograms and said to be equivalent to a carry-on suitcase. It is expected to be on the moon by the year 2030.

== See also ==
- List of rovers on extraterrestrial bodies
- Google Lunar X Prize
- Lander (spacecraft)
- LORAX
- Lunar rover
- Mars rover (Crewed)
- Tank on the Moon, 2007 documentary film
