= Tank on the Moon =

- DVD cover
- Directed by: Jean Afanassieff
- Narrated by: Chip Roughton (English)
- Production companies: Zed; Corona Films; France 5; Channel 5; Discovery Science Channel; CBC/RDI; SVT; RTBF
- Release date: 2007
- Running time: 44 minutes

Tank on the Moon is a French 2007 documentary film about the development, launch, and operation of the Soviet Moon exploration rovers, Lunokhod 1 and Lunokhod 2 in the period from 1970 to 1973. The film uses historical footage from American, Russian and French archives featuring Leonid Brezhnev, Yuri Gagarin, Lyndon Johnson, John F. Kennedy, Nikita Khrushchev, Sergei Korolev, Alexei Kosygin, Alexei Leonov, Sam Rayburn and many other contemporary figures. A special emphasis is placed on the Lunokhods' chief designer, Alexander Kemurdzhian.

== Summary ==
During the 1960s, the United States and the Soviet Union were engaged in a feverish technological competition, popularly known as the space race, to be the first to land a human on the Moon. The United States won the race, but less is known about a "secret chapter" from the Cold War era. Overshadowed by the Apollo Moon landings and largely ignored in the West at the time, the Soviets were also exploring the Moon with a series of successful robotic Moon missions. The Soviets never sent humans to the Moon, but they successfully guided two freely-roving robots by remote control from the Earth. For 16 months between 1970 and 1973, these Lunokhods traveled more than fifty kilometers (31 miles) over the Moon's surface. Although the results of the Lunokhod program were well publicized, details of the program were kept in utmost secrecy for two decades, until the secret Soviet space archives concerning this program were finally declassified.

With these archives, along with the recollections by surviving participants in the Lunokhod program, and archived news films, the full story of the Soviet lunar-roving robots is revealed; the development, deployment, technological achievements, and the legacy passed down to the new generation of planetary robotic rovers.

== Production and video release ==
The following companies and television stations helped produce and broadcast this film; Zed (Paris), with Corona Films (Saint-Petersburg), France 5, Channel 5 (Russia), CBC/RDI (Canada), SVT (Sweden), RTBF (Belgium), NHK (Japan). Louis Friedman, executive director of the Planetary Society appears in the film as a commentator. The first North American broadcast was on The Science Channel February 12, 2008.

This video documentary was produced in French, Brazilian Portuguese and English languages. An English language DVD was released in 2008, however the video is currently available only by digital download.

== Awards ==
- International Film Festival of Toulon (France) Archives Prize (Jacques Henri Blake Award)
- MEDIMED (Spain) Official Selection
- WORLDMEDIA Festival (Germany) Intermedia Globe Gold Award: Best Film (Politics Category)

== See also ==
- Lunokhod programme
- Soviet space program
