= Lunokhod programme =

Soviet Moon rover program

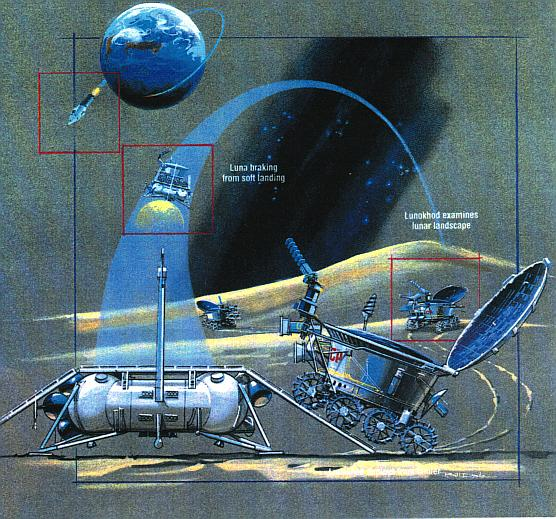
The Lunokhod mission diagram

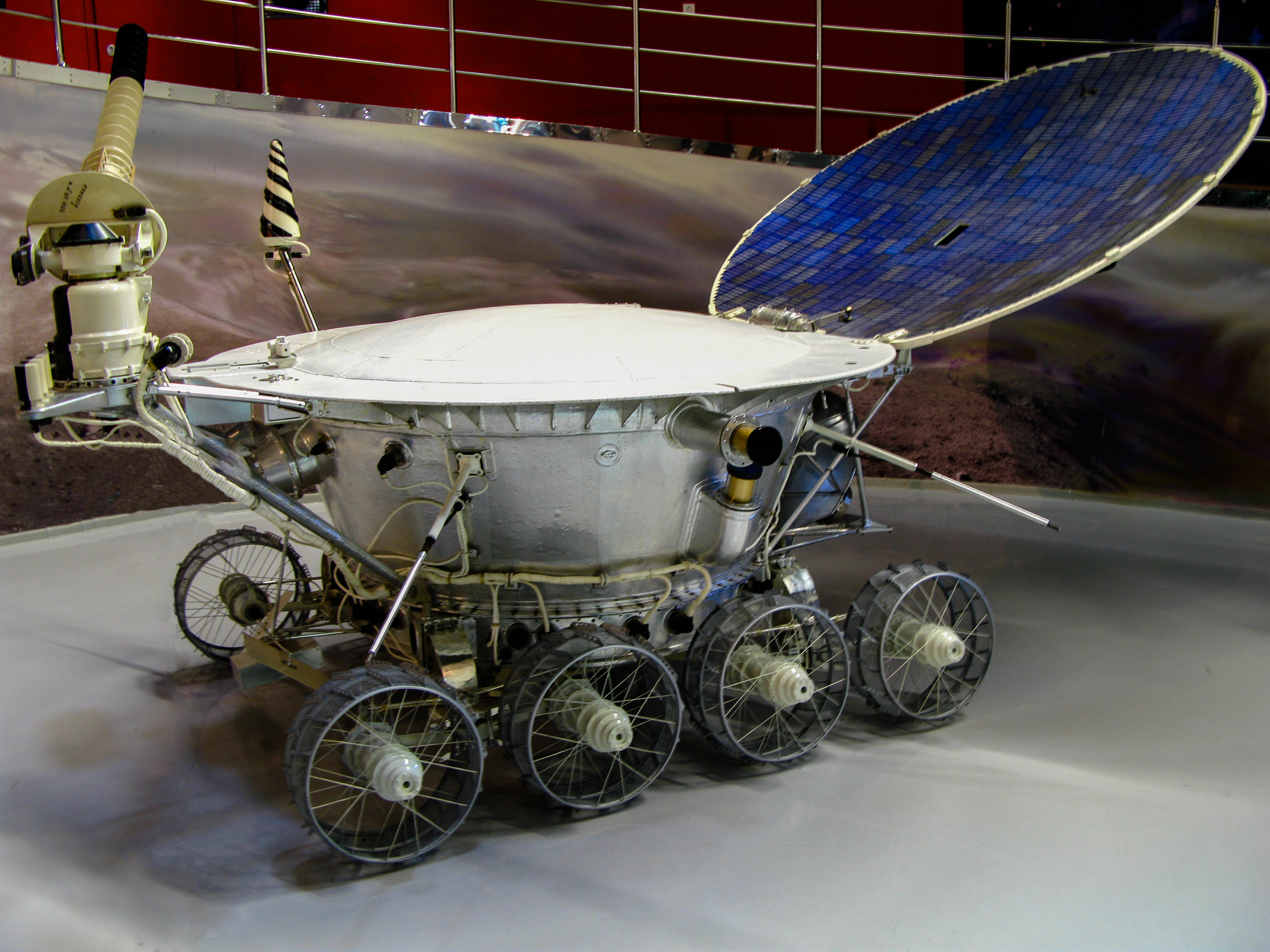
Soviet lunar rover

Lunokhod (Russian: Луноход, IPA: [lʊnɐˈxot], "Moonwalker") was a series of Soviet robotic lunar rovers designed to land on the Moon between 1969 and 1977. Lunokhod 1 was the first roving remote-controlled robot to land on an extraterrestrial body.

The 1969 Lunokhod 1A (Lunokhod 0, Lunokhod No. 201) was destroyed during launch, the 1970 Lunokhod 1 and the 1973 Lunokhod 2 landed on the Moon, and Lunokhod 3 (Lunokhod No. 205, planned for 1977) was never launched. The successful missions were in operation concurrently with the Zond and Luna series of Moon flyby, orbiter and landing missions.

The Lunokhods were primarily designed to support the Soviet human Moon missions during the Moon race. Instead, they were used as remote-controlled robots for exploration of the lunar surface and returning pictures, after the Apollo human lunar landings and cancellation of the Soviet human Moon programme.

The Lunokhods were transported to the lunar surface by Luna spacecraft, which were launched by Proton-K rockets.

== Development ==
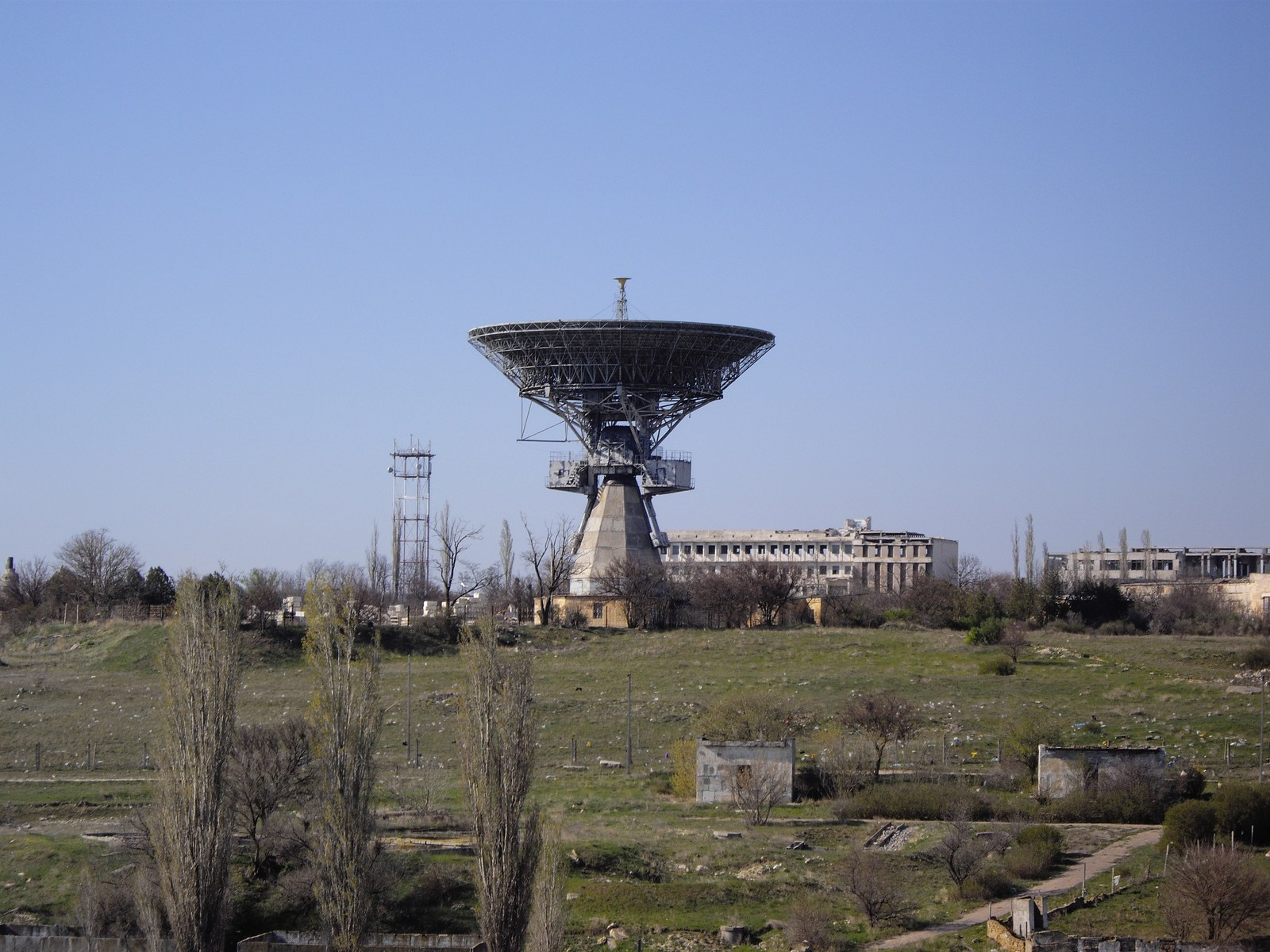
Parabolic dish TNA-400 and abandoned NIP-10

Lunokhod's original primary mission was to be the back-up for L3 crewed Moon expeditions and for the later Zvezda lunar base. For mission safety, weeks before the human mission on a LK lander, an LK-R uncrewed lander from the L3 lunar expedition complex and two Lunokhod automated rovers would be sent to the Moon for a preliminary study of the surface around LK-R and LK sites, to act as radio beacons for precision landings of LK-R and LK, and for a visual evaluation of the status of the site.

In mid-1968, at the facility KIP-10 or NIP-10 (КИП-10 or НИП-10, located at 45.052703°N 33.890256°E) in the closed town Shkolnoye (Simferopol-28), near Simferopol, Crimea, a lunodrom (лунодром - Moondrome, located at 45.054212°N 33.893627°E) was built. It covered an area of one hectare (120 meters by 70 meters) and was very similar to some parts of the lunar surface. It was constructed using more than 3,000 cubic meters of soil, and included 54 craters up to 16 m in diameter and around about 160 rocks of various sizes. The whole area was surrounded with bricks, painted in gray and black. It was used to analyze problems with the Lunokhod chassis and cosmonaut's skill to control one.

Closed town Simferopol-28 contained the most significant tracking facility in the Soviet Union, having the largest number of antennas, the largest area, and the most personnel of any of the Soviet tracking facilities. The facility was one of a network of ten facilities which contain earth satellite vehicle tracking equipment and provide command/control for Soviet near-space civil and military events. Additionally, this facility supported all lunar programmes of the Soviet Union, in association with the Evpatoria Deep Space Tracking Facility.

At least four complete vehicles were constructed, with the serial numbers 201, 203, 204 and 205.

== Rover design ==
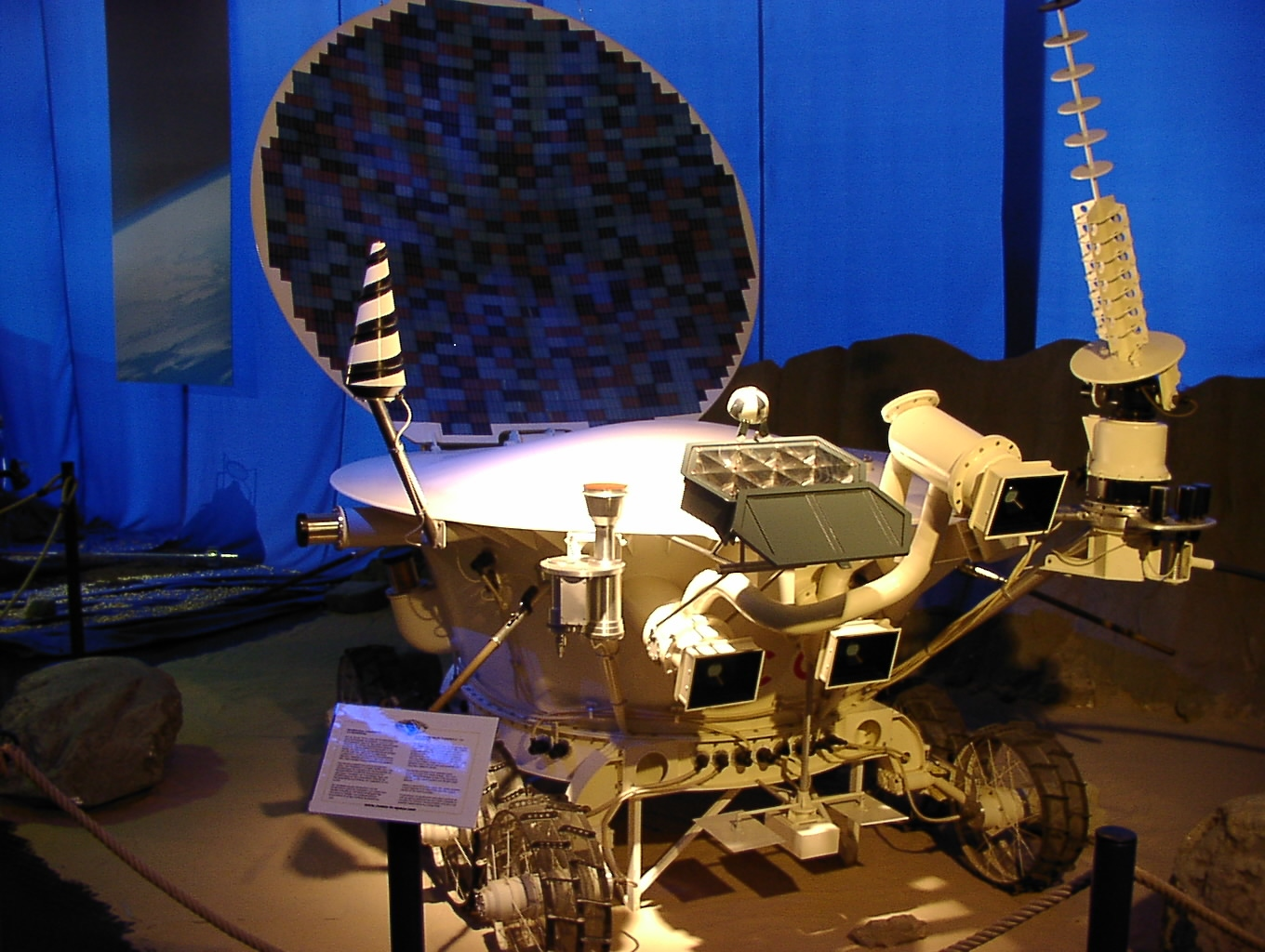
Model of Lunokhod vehicle

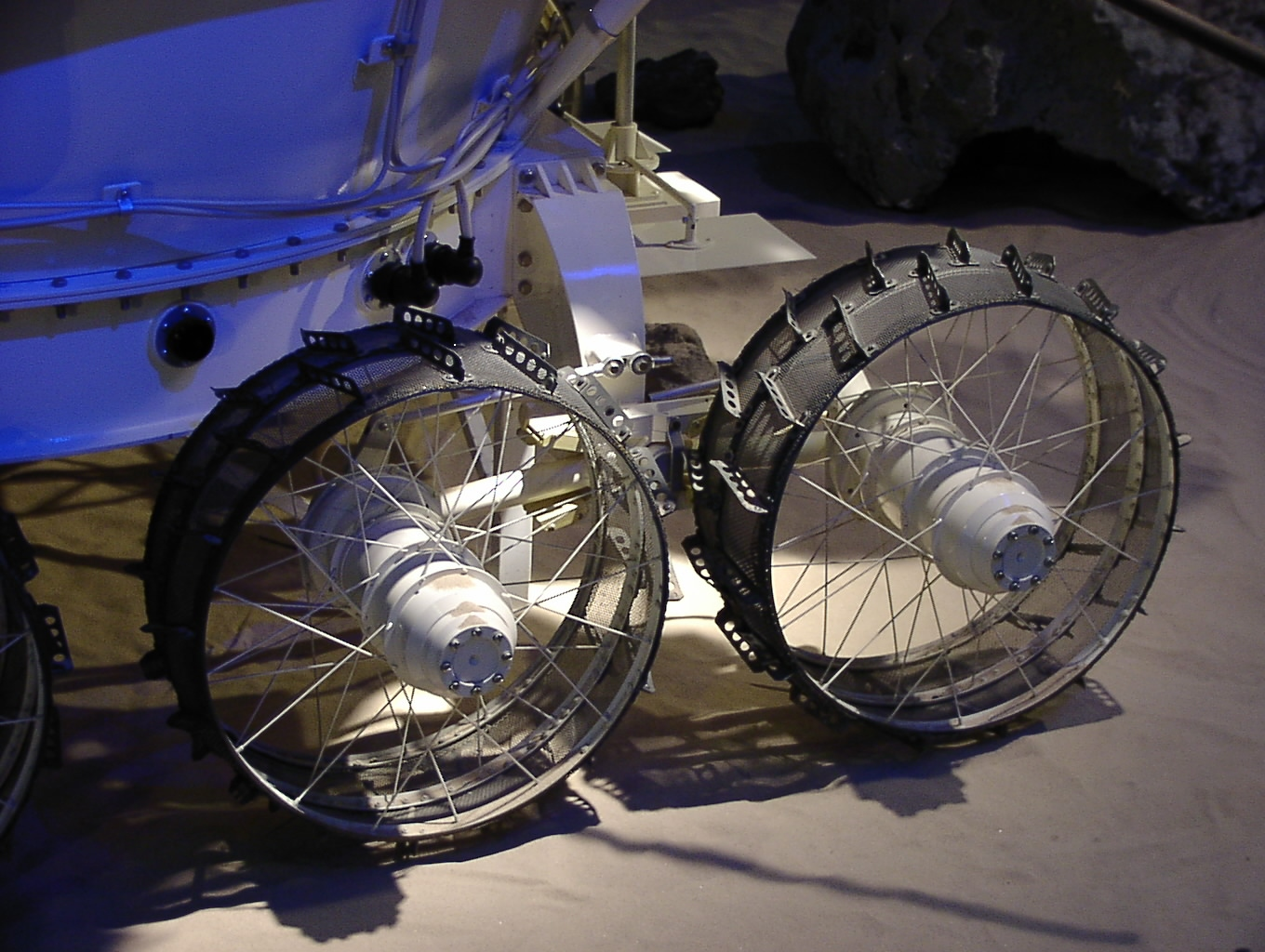
Detail of Lunokhod's wheels

The Lunokhod rovers were lunar vehicles formed of a tub-like compartment with a large convex lid on eight independently-powered wheels. They were equipped with a cone-shaped antenna, a highly directional helical antenna, television cameras, and special extendable devices to impact the lunar soil for density measurements and mechanical property tests, plus a scientific payload which varied with the mission.

The Lunokhods were designed under the leadership of Georgy Babakin at Lavochkin design bureau. The metal chassis themselves were designed by Alexander Kemurdzhian.

The vehicles were powered by batteries. The rover ran during the lunar day, stopping occasionally to recharge its batteries using its solar panels. The power was supplied during the lunar day by a GaAs solar array on the inside of a round hinged lid which covered the instrument bay, which would charge the batteries when opened. During the lunar nights, the lid was closed and a polonium-210 radioisotope heater unit kept the internal components at operating temperature.

To be able to work in a vacuum a special fluoride-based lubricant was used for the rover's mechanical parts, and the electric motors, one in each wheel hub, were enclosed in pressurised containers.

The rovers stood 135 centimetres (4 feet 5 inches) high and had a mass of 840 kg (1,850 lb). It was about 170 centimetres (5 feet 7 inches) long and 160 centimetres (5 feet 3 inches) wide and had eight wheels each with an independent suspension, motor and brake. The rover had two speeds, approximately 1 and 2 km/h (0.6 and 1.2 mph).

The Lunokhods were transported to the lunar surface by Luna spacecraft, which were launched by Proton-K rockets. The Moon lander part of the Luna spacecraft for Lunokhods was similar to the one for sample-return missions.

== Lunokhod Rovers ==
=== Lunokhod 201 ===
After years of secret engineering development and training, the first Lunokhod (vehicle 8ЕЛ№201) was launched on February 19, 1969. Within a few seconds the rocket disintegrated and the first Lunokhod was lost. The rest of the world did not learn of the rocket's valuable payload until years later. The failure resulted in the radioactive heat source, polonium 210, being spread over a large region of Russia.

=== Lunokhod 1 ===
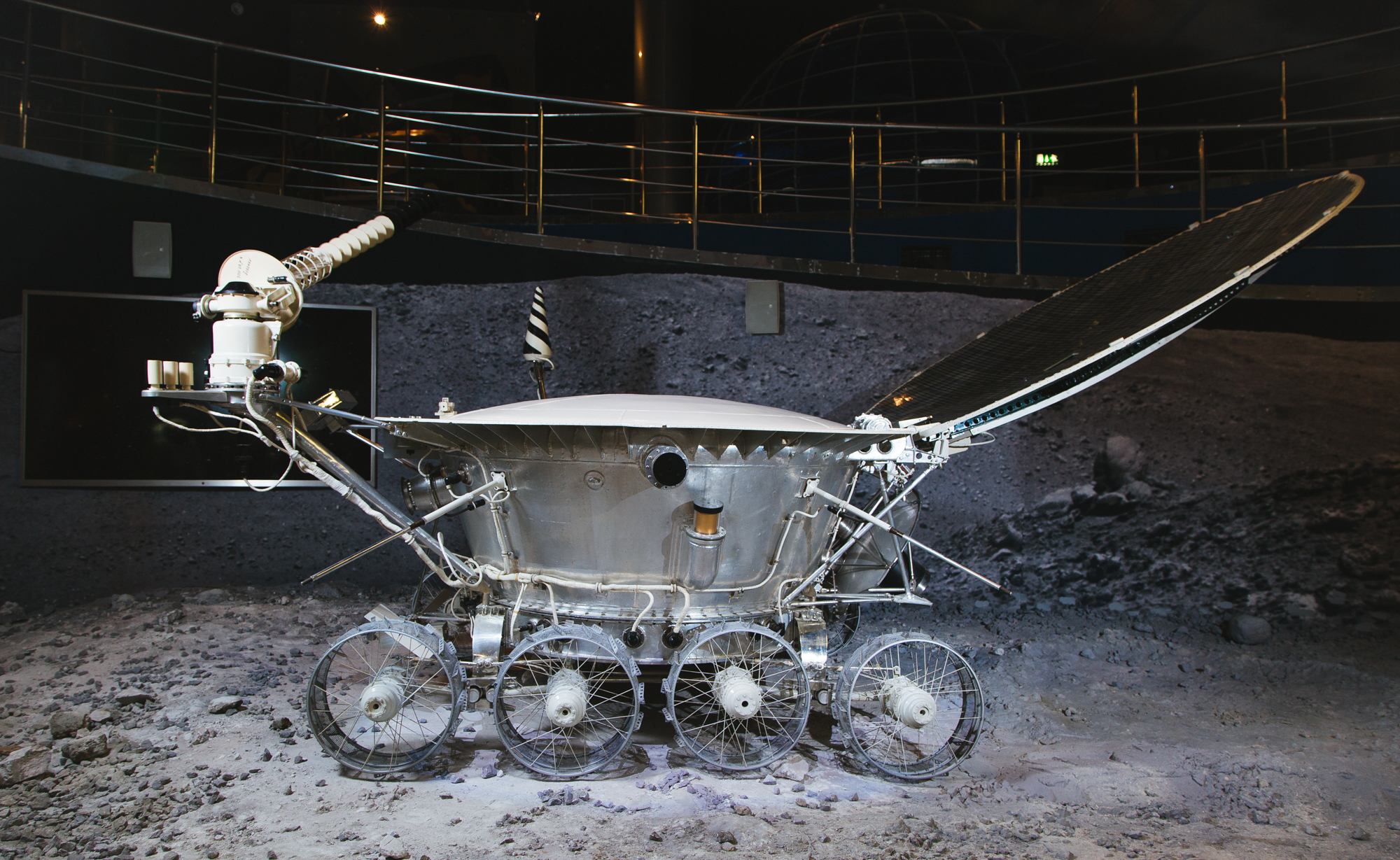
Lunokhod 1 model in the Museum of Cosmonautics (Moscow)

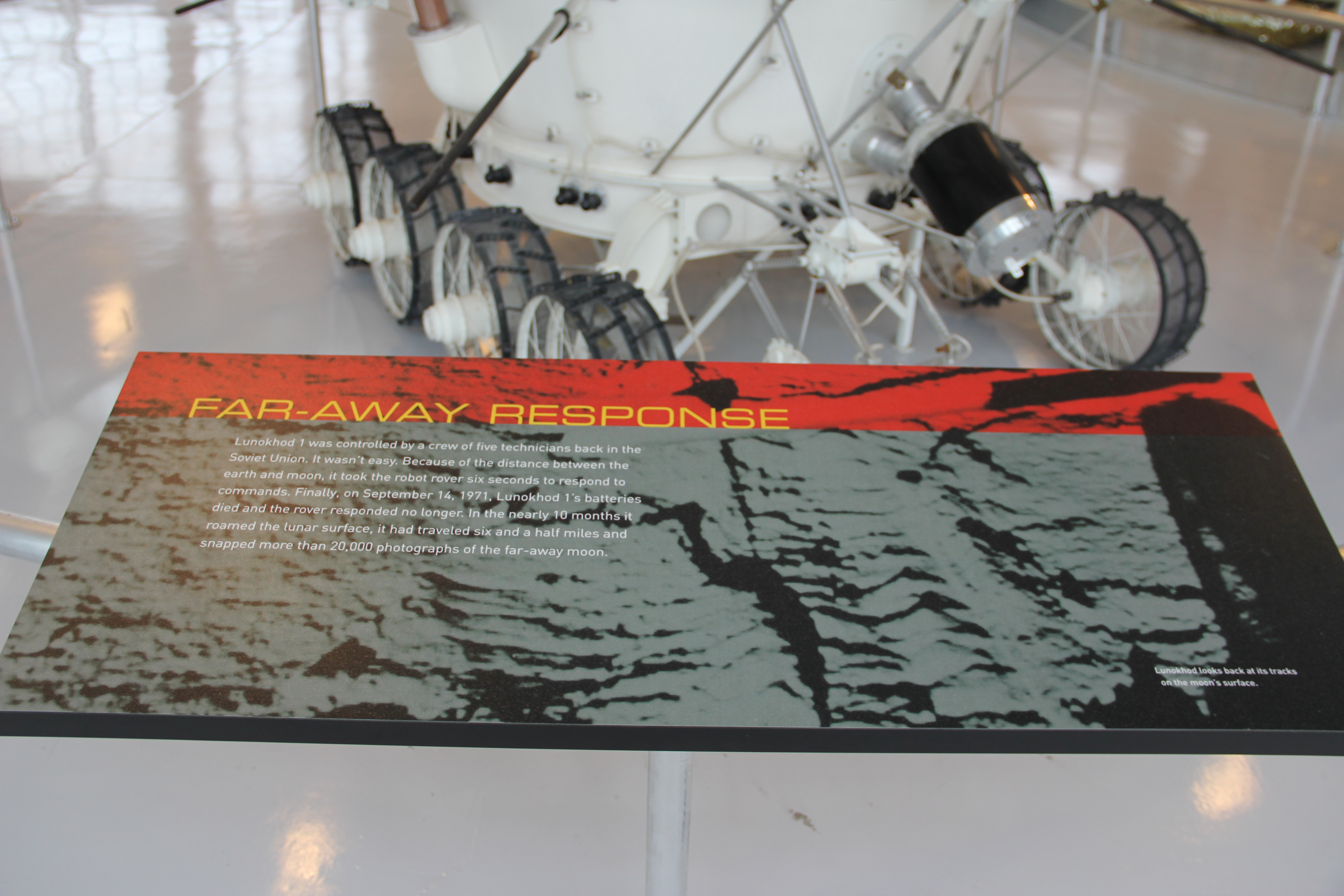
First photo made by Lunokhod 1 on Moon surface

After the destruction of the original Lunokhod, Soviet engineers began work immediately on another lunar vehicle. Lunokhod 1 (vehicle 8ЕЛ№203) was the first of two uncrewed lunar rovers successfully landed on the Moon by the Soviet Union as part of its Lunokhod programme. The spacecraft which carried Lunokhod 1 was named Luna 17. Lunokhod 1 was the first roving remote-controlled robot to land on another world.

Luna 17 was launched on November 10, 1970 at 14:44:01 UTC. After reaching Earth parking orbit, the final stage of Luna 17's launching rocket fired to place it into a trajectory towards the Moon (November 10, 1970 at 14:54 UTC). After two course correction manoeuvres (on November 12 and 14) it entered lunar orbit on November 15, 1970 at 22:00 UTC.

The spacecraft soft-landed on the Moon in the Sea of Rains on November 17, 1970 at 03:47 UTC. The lander had dual ramps from which the payload, Lunokhod 1, could descend to the surface. At 06:28 UT the rover moved down the ramps and onto the Moon.

The rover's payload included cameras (two television and four panoramic telephotometers), a RIFMA X-ray fluorescence spectrometer, an RT-1 X-ray telescope, a PrOP odometer/penetrometer, a RV-2N radiation detector, and a TL laser retroreflector.

An urban legend was spread among the Soviet Union that the Lunokhod rover was driven by a “KGB Dwarf”, however it was never explained how supplies were stored to keep them alive for an 11-month mission.

=== Lunokhod 2 ===
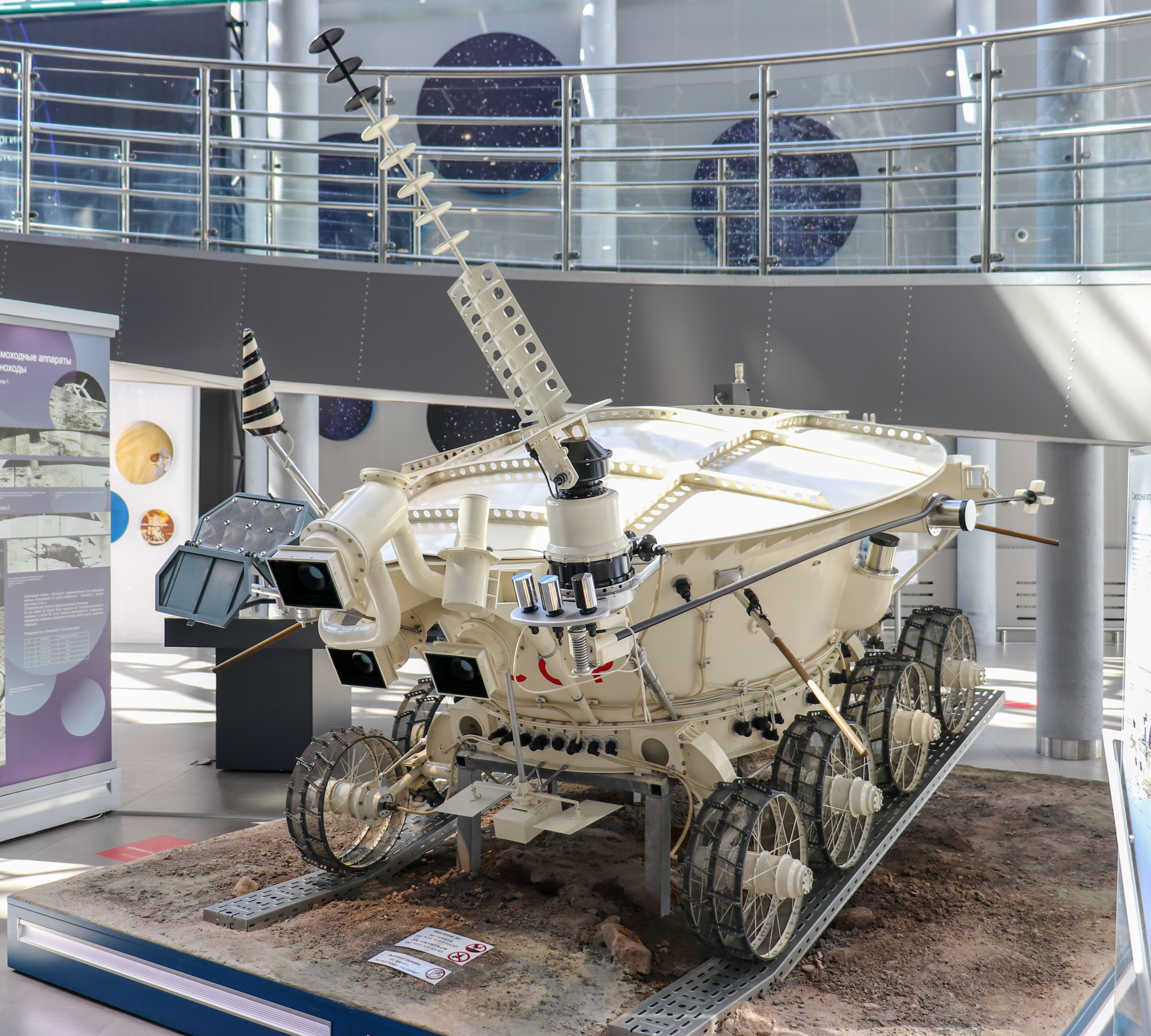
Lunokhod 2 model in the Tsiolkovsky State Museum of the History of Cosmonautics

Lunokhod 2 (vehicle 8ЕЛ№204) was the second and more advanced of the two Lunokhod rovers. The launcher put the spacecraft into Earth parking orbit on January 8, 1973, followed by a translunar injection. On January 12, 1973, Luna 21 was braked into a 90 by 100 km (56 by 62 miles) lunar orbit.

The Luna 21 spacecraft landed on the Moon to deploy the second Soviet lunar rover, Lunokhod 2. The primary objectives of the mission were to collect images of the lunar surface, examine ambient light levels to determine the feasibility of astronomical observations from the Moon, perform laser ranging experiments from Earth, observe solar X-rays, measure local magnetic fields, and study mechanical properties of the lunar surface material.

The landing occurred on January 15, 1973 at 23:35 UT in Le Monnier crater (25.85 degrees N, 30.45 degrees E).

After landing the Lunokhod 2 took television images of the surrounding area, then rolled down a ramp to the surface at 01:14 UT on 1973-01-16. It then took pictures of the Luna 21 lander and landing site.

The rover was equipped with three slow-scan television cameras, one mounted high on the rover for navigation, which could return high resolution images at different rates—3.2, 5.7, 10.9 or 21.1 seconds per frame (not frames per second). These images were used by the five-man team of controllers on Earth who sent driving commands to the rover in real time. There were four panoramic cameras mounted on the rover.

Scientific instruments included a soil mechanics tester, solar X-ray experiment, an astrophotometer to measure visible and ultraviolet light levels, a magnetometer deployed in front of the rover on the end of a 2.5 m (8 ft 2 in) boom, a radiometer, a photodetector (Rubin-1) for laser detection experiments, and a French-supplied laser corner reflector.

==== Payload ====
- Cameras (three television and four panoramic telephotometers)
- RIFMA-M X-ray fluorescence spectrometer
- X-ray telescope
- PROP odometer/penetrometer
- RV-2N-LS radiation detector
- TL laser retroreflector
- AF-3L UV/visible astrophotometer
- SG-70A magnetometer
- Rubin 1 photodetector

=== Lunokhod 3 ===
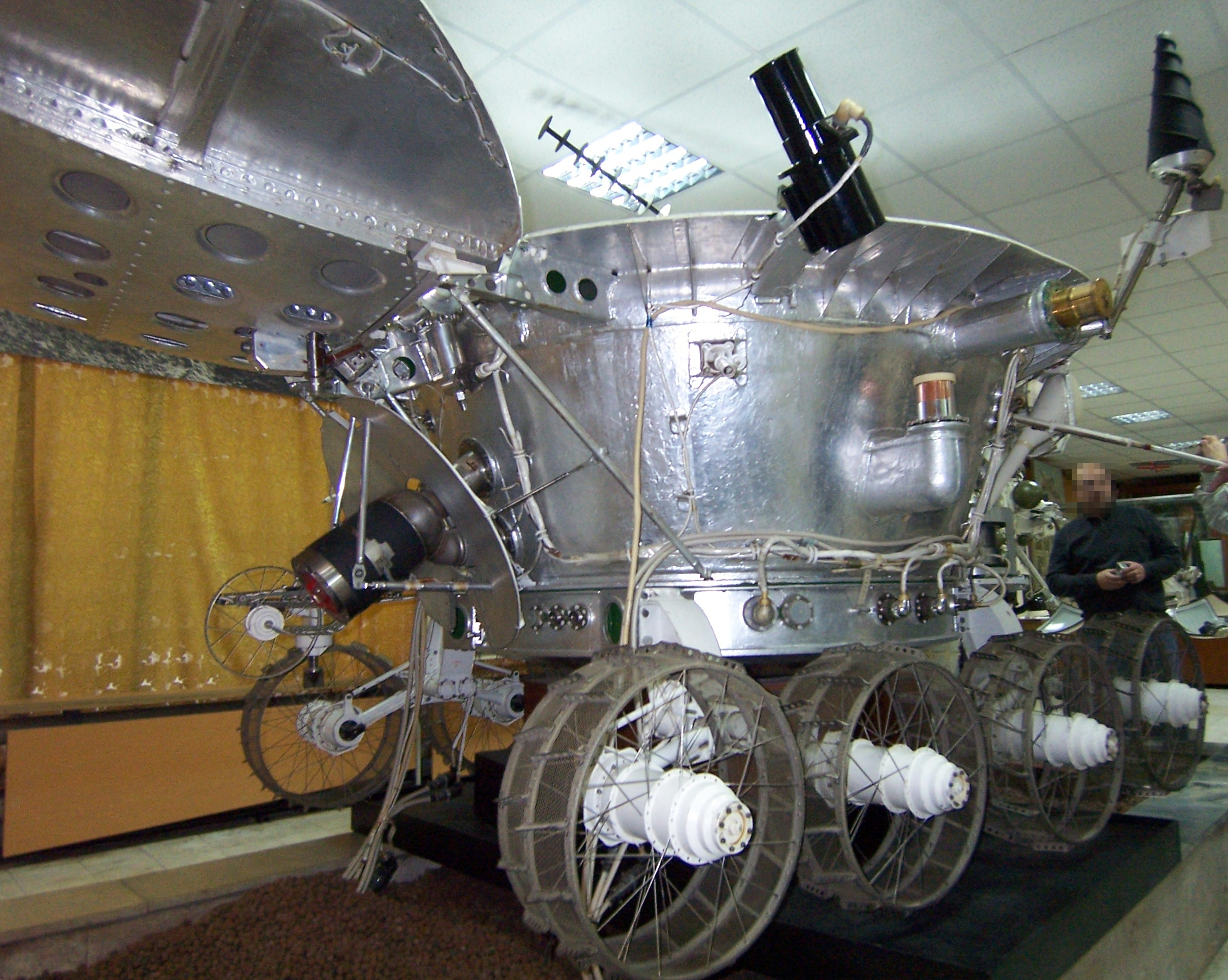
Lunokhod 3 (side view)

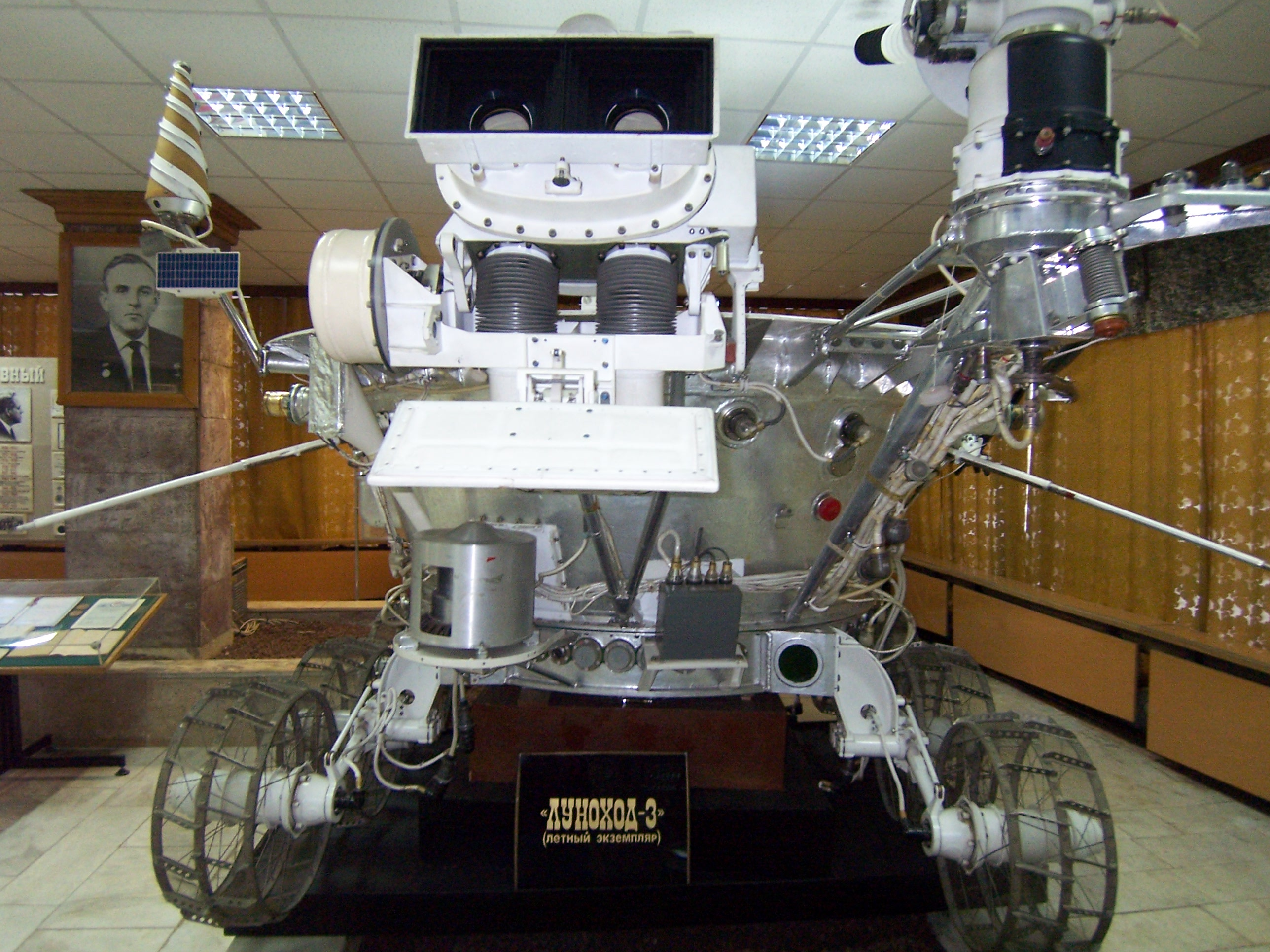
Lunokhod 3 (front view)

Lunokhod 3 (vehicle 8ЕЛ№205) was built for a Moon landing in 1977 as Luna 25, but never flew to the Moon due to lack of launchers and funding. It remains at the NPO Lavochkin museum.

== Results ==
During its 322 Earth days of operations, Lunokhod 1 travelled 10.5 km (6.5 miles) and returned more than 20,000 television images and 206 high-resolution panoramas. In addition, it performed twenty-five soil analyses with its RIFMA x-ray fluorescence spectrometer and used its penetrometer at 500 different locations.

Lunokhod 2 operated for about four months, covered 42 km (26 miles) of terrain, including driving into hilly upland areas and rilles. Lunokhod 2 held the record for the longest distance of surface travel of any extraterrestrial vehicle until 2014. It sent back 86 panoramic images and over 80,000 television pictures. Many mechanical tests of the Moon's surface, laser ranging measurements, and other experiments were completed during this time.

In 2010, nearly forty years after the 1971 loss of signal from Lunokhod 1, the NASA Lunar Reconnaissance Orbiter photographed its tracks and final location, and researchers, using a telescopic pulsed-laser rangefinder, detected the robot's retroreflector.

Not until Mars Pathfinder's deployment of the "Sojourner" Rover in 1997 was another remote-controlled vehicle put on an extraterrestrial body. For comparison, the similarly sized NASA Mars Exploration Rovers, Spirit and Opportunity had, by their fifth anniversary in January 2009, traveled a total of 21 km (13 miles) and transmitted over 125,000 images.

== Legacy ==
According to a French documentary television film Tank on the Moon by Jean Afanassieff, the Lunokhod design returned to the limelight 15 years later due to the Chernobyl nuclear power plant disaster on April 26, 1986. The East German-built remote controlled bulldozers available to Soviet civil defense troops weighed dozens of tons – too heavy to operate on the remaining parts of the partially collapsed reactor building roof. Human labourers could not be employed to shovel debris since work shifts were limited to 90-second intervals due to intense ionizing radiation.

Lunokhod designers were called back from retirement, and in two weeks rovers were made which used nuclear decay heat sources for internal rack climate control, their electronic systems were already hardened to partly resist radiation. This benefit allowed the 1986 designers to quickly devise a derived vehicle type for nuclear disaster recovery work. On July 15, two rovers, called STR-1, were delivered to the Chernobyl accident zone and proved useful for clearing debris, earning awards for the designers. Due to extremely high radiation levels, both STR-1 rovers eventually failed, and human workers (later named liquidators) were called in once again.

== Locations and ownership ==
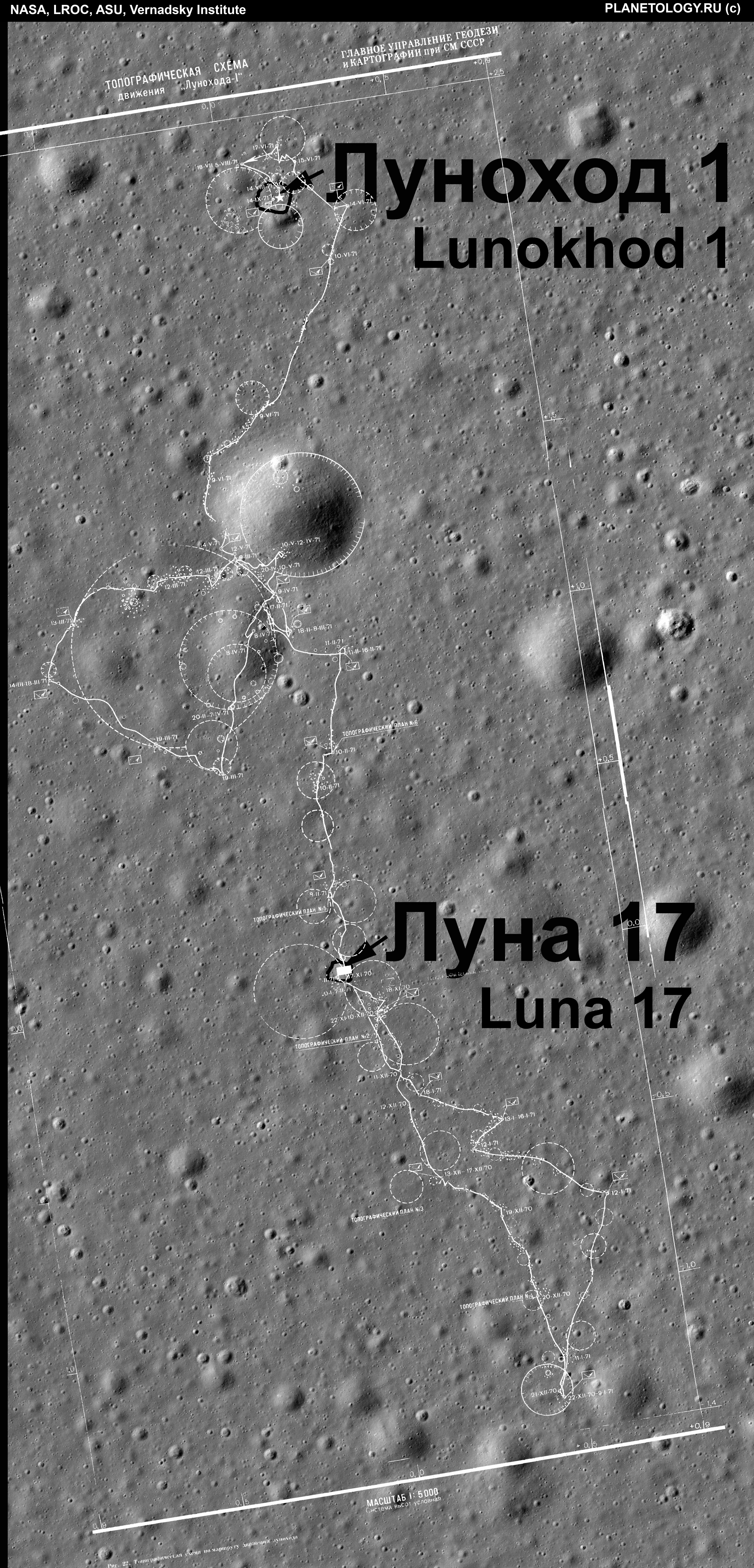
Luna 17 and Lunokhod 1 landing site photographed by LRO

Until 2010, the final location of Lunokhod 1 was uncertain by a few kilometers. Lunar laser ranging experiments had failed to detect a return signal from its retroreflector since the 1970s. On March 17, 2010, Albert Abdrakhimov found both the lander and the rover in Lunar Reconnaissance Orbiter image M114185541RC. On April 22, Tom Murphy (UCSD) and Russet McMillan at the Apache Point Observatory detected the robot's retroreflector using the Apache Point telescopic pulsed-laser rangefinder.

Lunokhod 2 continues to be detected by lunar laser ranging experiments and its position is known to sub-metre accuracy. Ownership of Lunokhod 2 and the Luna 21 lander was sold by the Lavochkin Association for US$68,500 in December 1993 at a Sotheby's auction in New York (although the catalogue incorrectly lists lot 68A as Luna 17/Lunokhod 1). The buyer was computer gaming entrepreneur and astronaut's son Richard Garriott, who is also known by the name of his gaming character Lord British. Garriott stated in a 2001 interview: "I purchased Lunakod 21 [sic] from the Russians. I am now the world's only private owner of an object on a foreign celestial body. Though there are international treaties that say no government shall lay claim to geography off planet earth, I am not a government. Summarily, I claim the Moon in the name of Lord British!" In 2007, Garriott said he is still the owner of Lunokhod 2.

== See also ==
- Exploration of the Moon
- Mars Exploration Rovers
- Mars Pathfinder
- Tank on the Moon
- Lunar rover
