= Lunokhod 2 =

Second robotic Moon rover (1973)

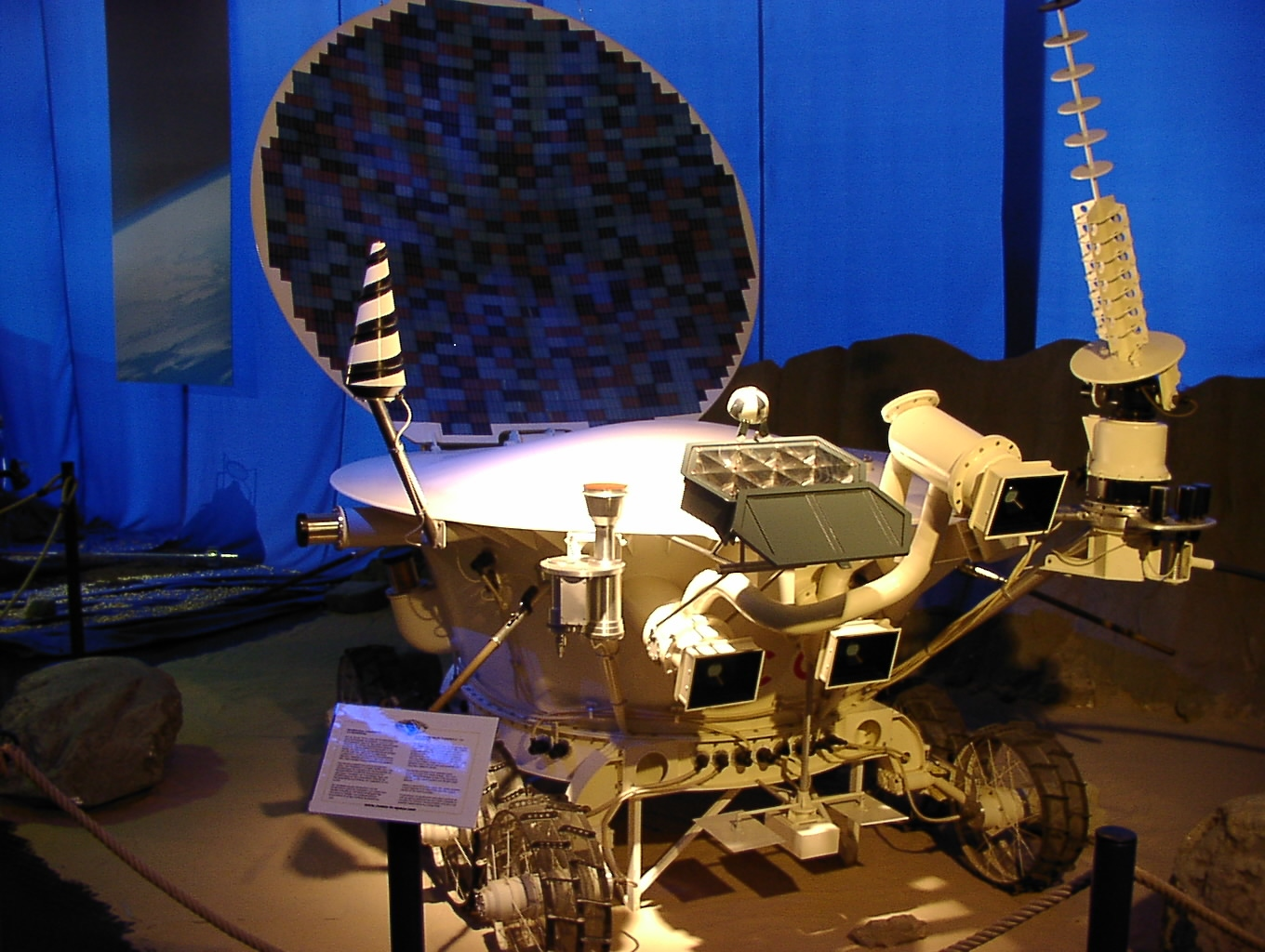
- Model of Lunokhod 2 rover
- Mission type: Lunar rover
- COSPAR ID: 1973-001A

Spacecraft properties
- Dry mass: 840 kilograms (1,850 lb) (rover only)

Start of mission
- Launch date: January 8, 1973, 06:55:38 UTC
- Rocket: Proton-K/D
- Launch site: Baikonur 81/23

End of mission
- Last contact: May 11, 1973

Lunar rover
- Spacecraft component: Rover
- Landing date: January 15, 1973

Lunokhod 2 (Russian: Луноход-2 ("Moonwalker 2"), also known as Аппарат 8ЕЛ № 204 ("Device 8EL No. 204")) was the second of two uncrewed lunar rovers that landed on the Moon by the Soviet Union as part of the Lunokhod programme.

The Luna 21 spacecraft landed on the Moon and deployed the second Soviet lunar rover, Lunokhod 2, in January 1973. The lander and rover together massed 1814 kg.

The primary objectives of the mission were to collect images of the lunar surface, examine ambient light levels to determine the feasibility of astronomical observations from the Moon, perform laser ranging experiments from Earth, observe solar X-rays, measure local magnetic fields, and study the soil mechanics of the lunar surface material.

== Lunokhod 2 rover and subsystems ==
The rover stood 135 centimetres (4 feet 5 inches) high and had a mass of 840 kg (1,850 lb). It was about 170 centimetres (5 feet 7 inches) long and 160 centimetres (5 feet 3 inches) wide and had eight wheels each with an independent suspension, electric motor and brake. The rover had two speeds, about 1 and 2 km/h (0.62 and 1.24 mph).

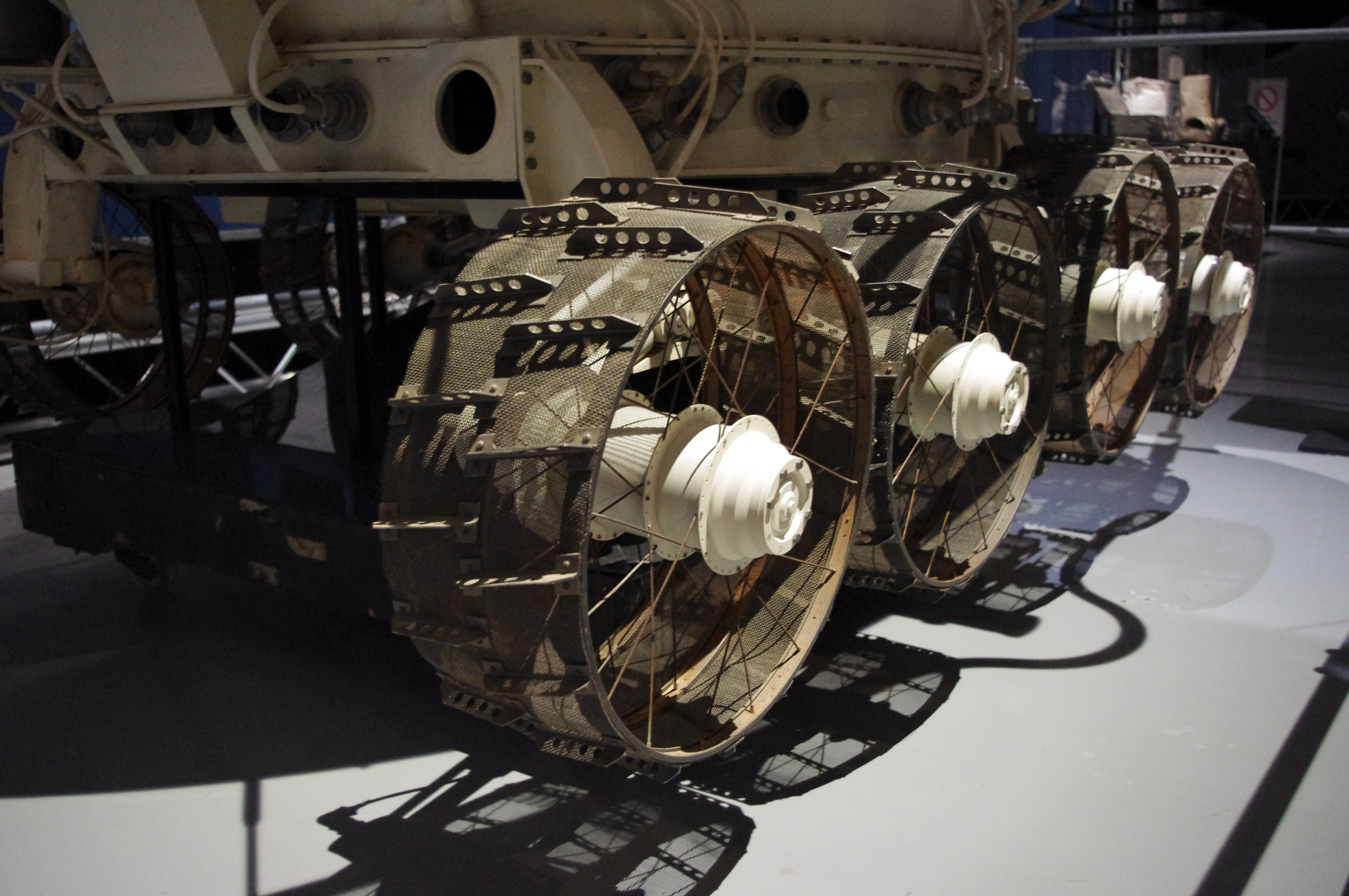
Detail of Lunokhod's wheels

Lunokhod 2 was equipped with three television cameras, one mounted high on the rover for navigation, which could return high resolution images at different frame rates—3.2, 5.7, 10.9 or 21.1 seconds per frame. These images were used by a five-man team of controllers on Earth who sent driving commands to the rover in real time.

Power was supplied by a solar panel on the inside of a round hinged lid which covered the instrument bay, which would charge the batteries when opened. A polonium-210 radioisotope heater unit was used to keep the rover warm during the long lunar nights.

There were four panoramic cameras mounted on the rover. Scientific instruments included a soil mechanics tester, solar X-ray experiment, an astrophotometer to measure visible and ultraviolet light levels, a magnetometer deployed in front of the rover on the end of a 2.5 m (8 ft 2 in) boom, a radiometer, a photodetector (Rubin-1) for laser detection experiments, and a French-supplied laser corner reflector.

The lander carried a bas relief of Vladimir Lenin and the State Emblem of the Soviet Union.

== Mission ==
The Proton-K/D launcher put the spacecraft into Earth parking orbit followed by translunar injection. On January 12, 1973, Luna 21 was braked into a 90 by 100 km (56 by 62 mi) lunar orbit. On January 13 and 14, the perilune was lowered to 16 km (9.9 mi) altitude.

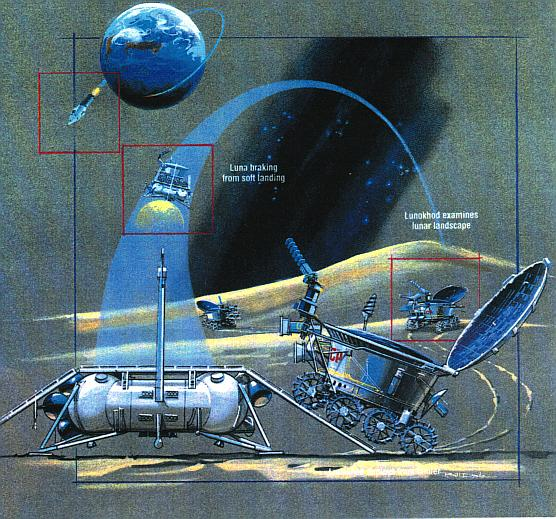
Scheme of Lunokhod mission

== Landing and surface operations ==
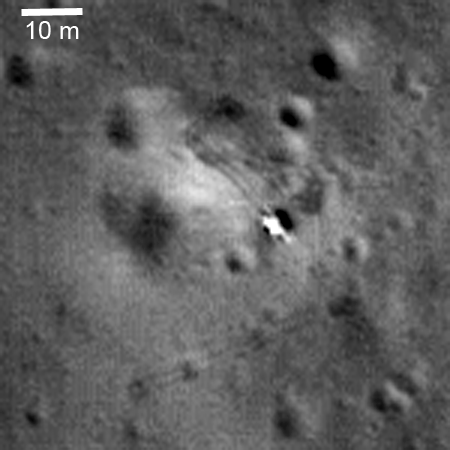
Luna 21 lander that delivered the second soviet robotic lunar rover Lunokhod - 2 to the Moon as seen from orbit by Lunar Reconnaissance Orbiter in March, 2010

On January 15, 1973, after 40 orbits, the descent of the craft was commenced as the braking rocket was fired at 16 km (9.9 mi) altitude, and the craft began to de-orbit. At an altitude of 750 m (2,460 ft) the main thrusters began firing, slowing the fall until a height of 22 m (72 ft) was reached. At this point the main thrusters shut down and the secondary thrusters ignited, slowing the fall until the lander was 1.5 m (4.9 ft) above the surface, where the engine was switched off. Landing occurred at 23:35 UT in Le Monnier crater at 25.85 degrees N, 30.45 degrees E.

After landing, the Lunokhod 2 took TV images of the surrounding area, then rolled down a ramp to the surface at 01:14 UT on January 16 and took pictures of the Luna 21 lander and landing site, driving for 30 metres. After a period of charging up its batteries, it took more pictures of the site and the lander, and then set off to explore the Moon.

The rover would run during the lunar day, stopping occasionally to recharge its batteries with the solar panels. At night the rover hibernated until the next sunrise, heated by the radioactive source.

- January 18, 1973 to January 24, 1973: The rover drives 1,260 metres
- February 8 to 23: The rover drives 9,086 metres further
- March 11 to 23: The rover drives 16,533 metres further
- April 9 to 22: The rover drives 8,600 metres further
- May 8 to June 3: The rover drives 880 metres further

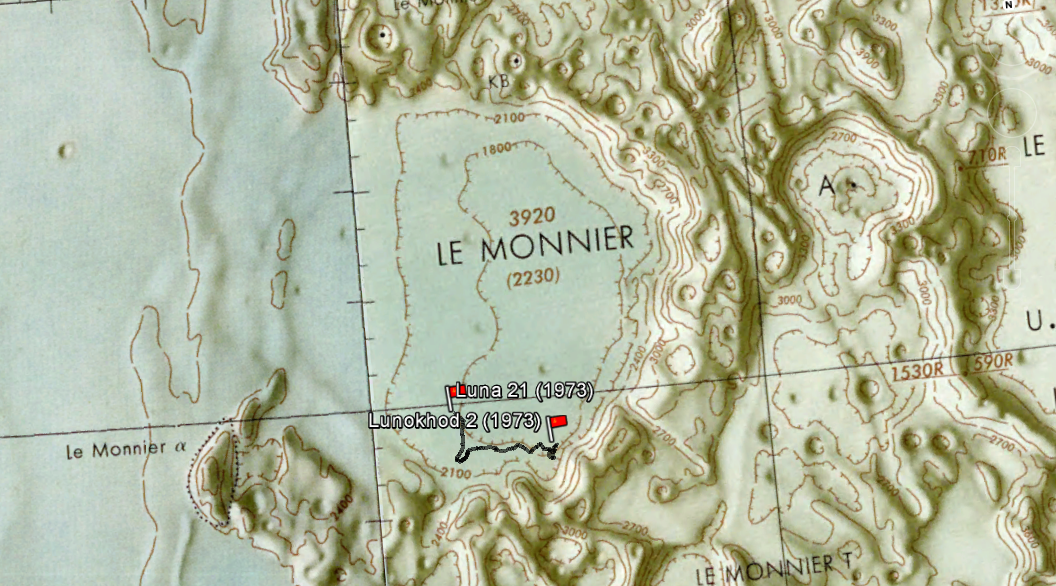
Map of Lunokhod 2's path in Le Monnier crater at the eastern rim of Mare Serenitatis

== End of mission ==
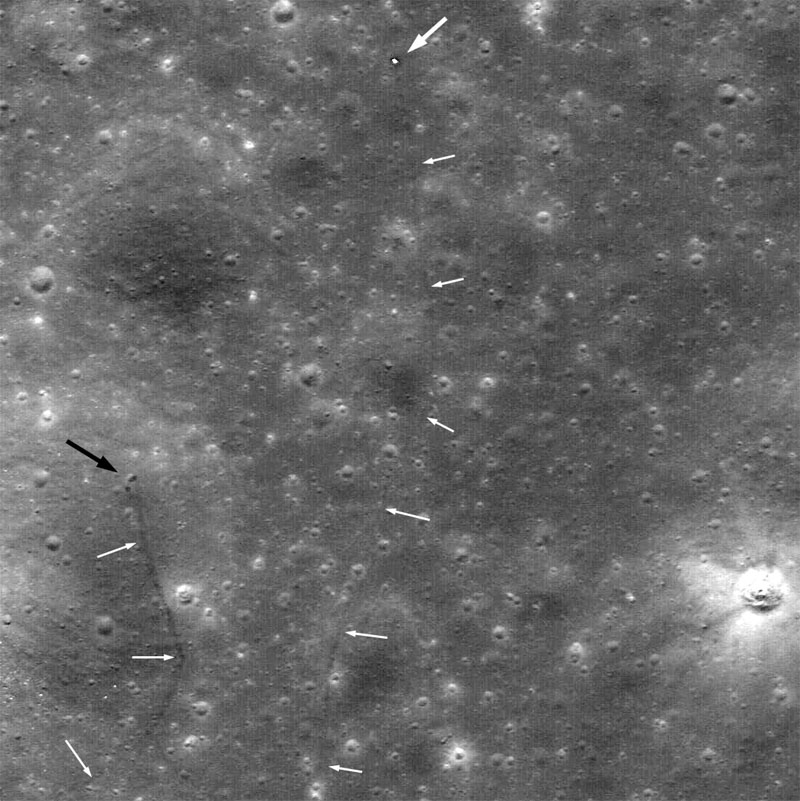
Lunar Reconnaissance Orbiter image of Lunokhod 2 and its tracks. The large white arrow indicates the rover, the smaller white arrows indicate the rover's tracks, and the black arrow indicates the crater where it picked up its fatal load of lunar dust.

Lunokhod 2 rover parked facing southeast with the lid still open. Rover tracks extend north to the final parking place. The inset is a zoomed in view of the rover, the main rover body is labeled B, the open lid is labeled L and the instrument suite on the front of the rover is labeled I.

On June 4, 1973, it was announced that the program was completed, leading to speculation that the vehicle probably failed in mid-May or could not be revived after the lunar night of May–June.

More recently, Alexander Basilevsky related an account in which on May 9, the rover's open lid touched a crater wall and became covered with dust. When the lid was closed, this dust (a very good insulator) was dumped on to the radiators. The following day, May 10, controllers saw the internal temperature of Lunokhod 2 climb as it was unable to cool itself, eventually rendering the rover inoperable. On May 11, signal from the rover was lost.

== Results ==
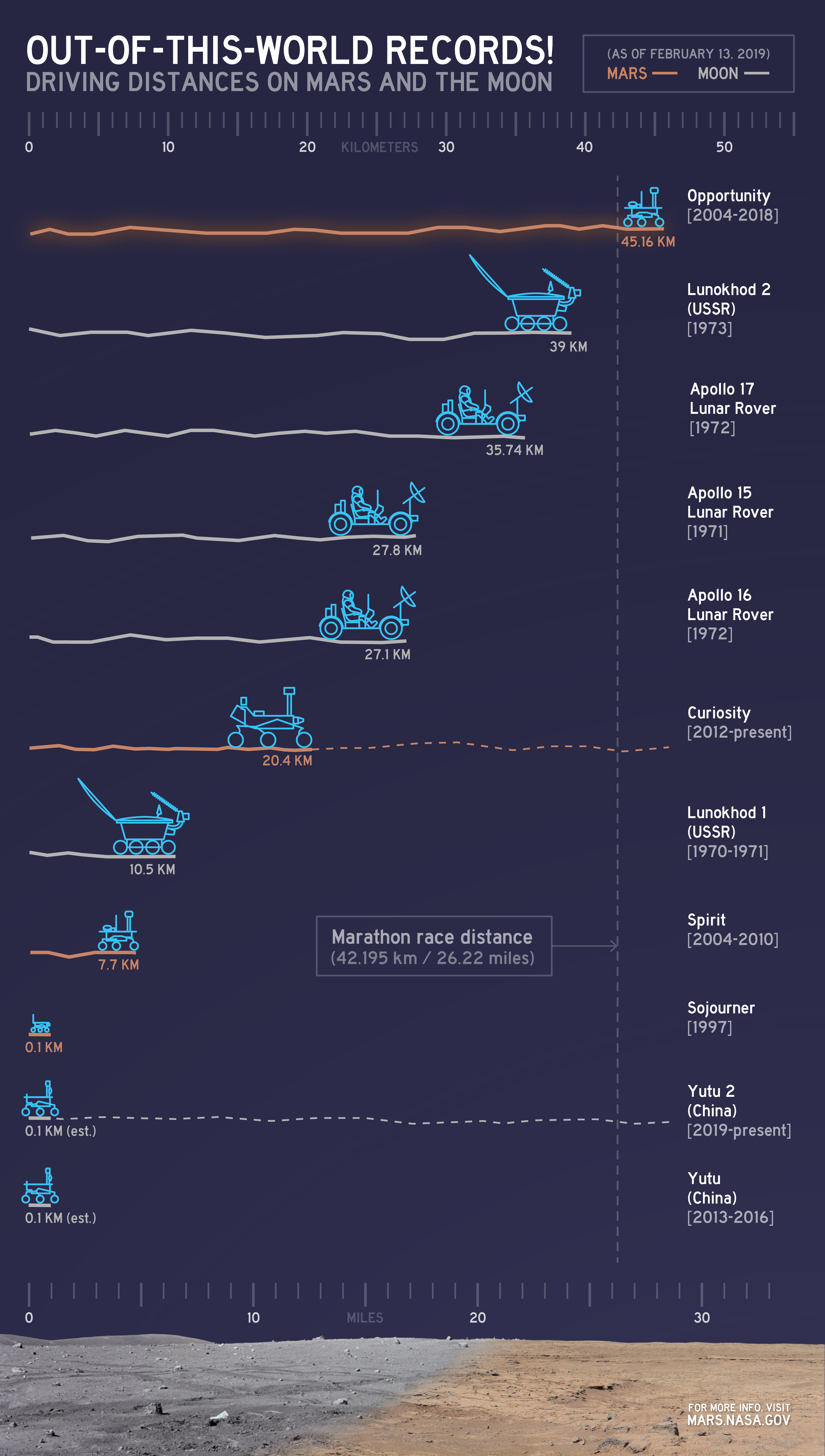
Driving Distances by rovers on Mars and the Moon as of February 2019.

Lunokhod 2 operated for about four months, and the original estimate was that it covered 37 km (23 mi) of terrain, including hilly upland areas and rilles, and sent back 86 panoramic images and over 80,000 TV pictures. Many mechanical tests of the surface, laser ranging measurements, and other experiments were completed during this time. Lunokhod 2 was thought to have covered 37 km (23 mi) based on wheel rotations but Russian scientists at the Moscow State University of Geodesy and Cartography (MIIGAiK) revised that to an estimated distance of about 42.1–42.2 km (26.2–26.2 mi) based on Lunar Reconnaissance Orbiter (LRO) images of the lunar surface. Subsequent discussions with their American counterparts ended with an agreed-upon final distance of 39 km (24 mi); an international team has confirmed that the methods used to calculate the two rovers' odometry is consistent and comparable from the Moon to Mars.

Lunokhod 2 held the record for off-Earth roving distance until July 27, 2014, when NASA's Mars Opportunity rover exceeded it after having traveled over 40 km (25 mi).

== Current status ==
Lunokhod 2 continues to be detected by lunar laser ranging experiments and its position is known to sub-meter accuracy. On March 17, 2010, Phil Stooke at the University of Western Ontario announced that he had located Lunokhod 2 in NASA Lunar Reconnaissance Orbiter (LRO) images, but later images showed the initial identification was incorrect (the identified point was a mark in the rover tracks near the end of the route, made as Lunokhod 2 turned around), and the LRO LROC team identified the correct location of the rover in March 2012. Excellent Lunokhod 2 images from LROC were published by Mark Robinson on SESE site of ASU.

== Present ownership ==
Ownership of Lunokhod 2 and the Luna 21 lander was sold by the Lavochkin Association for $68,500 in December 1993 at a Sotheby's auction in New York. (The catalog incorrectly lists lot 68A as Luna 17/Lunokhod 1).

The buyer was computer game entrepreneur and space tourist Richard Garriott (son of the astronaut Owen K. Garriott), who stated in a 2001 interview with Computer Games Magazine's Cindy Yans that:

I purchased Lunakod 21 [sic] from the Russians. I am now the world's only private owner of an object on a foreign celestial body. Though there are international treaties that say, no government shall lay claim to geography off planet earth, I am not a government. Summarily, I claim the moon in the name of Lord British!

Garriott later confirmed that he is the owner of Lunokhod 2.

== See also ==
- Exploration of the Moon
- Lunar rover
- Lunokhod 1
- Rover (space exploration)
- Timeline of artificial satellites and space probes
- List of artificial objects on the Moon
- List of missions to the Moon
