= Luna 21 =

Soviet lunar lander that carried the Lunokhod 2 rover to the Moon

- Luna 21 as seen from orbit by the LRO in March 2010
- Mission type: Planetary Science
- Operator: Soviet space program
- COSPAR ID: 1973-001A
- SATCAT no.: 6333
- Mission duration: 8 days (day of launch to day of landing)

Spacecraft properties
- Spacecraft: s/n 204
- Spacecraft type: Ye-8
- Manufacturer: GSMZ Lavochkin
- Launch mass: 5,700 kg (12,600 lb)
- Dry mass: 4,850 kg (10,690 lb)

Start of mission
- Launch date: 06:55:38, 8 January 1973 (UTC)
- Rocket: Proton-K/D
- Launch site: Baikonur 81/23

Orbital parameters
- Reference system: Selenocentric
- Periselene altitude: 90 km (56 mi)
- Aposelene altitude: 100 km (62 mi)
- Inclination: 60°

Moon orbiter
- Orbital insertion: 12 January 1973
- Orbits: ~36

Moon lander
- Landing date: 22:35, 15 January 1973
- Landing site: 25.85°N 30.45°E

Moon rover
- Spacecraft component: Lunokhod 2
- Landing date: 01:14, 16 January 1973
- Distance driven: 42 km (26 mi)
Instruments
- Photographic imaging system
- X-ray spectrometer
- Penetrometer
- Laser reflector
- Radiation detectors
- X-ray telescope
- Odometer/Speedometer
- Visible/ultraviolet photometer
- Magnetometer
- Photodetector

Luna 21 (Ye-8 series) was an uncrewed space mission, and its spacecraft, of the Luna program, also called Lunik 21, in 1973. The spacecraft landed on the Moon and deployed the second Soviet lunar rover, Lunokhod 2. The primary objectives of the mission were to collect images of the lunar surface, examine ambient light levels to determine the feasibility of astronomical observations from the Moon, perform laser ranging experiments from Earth, observe solar X-rays, measure local magnetic fields, and study mechanical properties of the lunar surface material.

== Mission ==
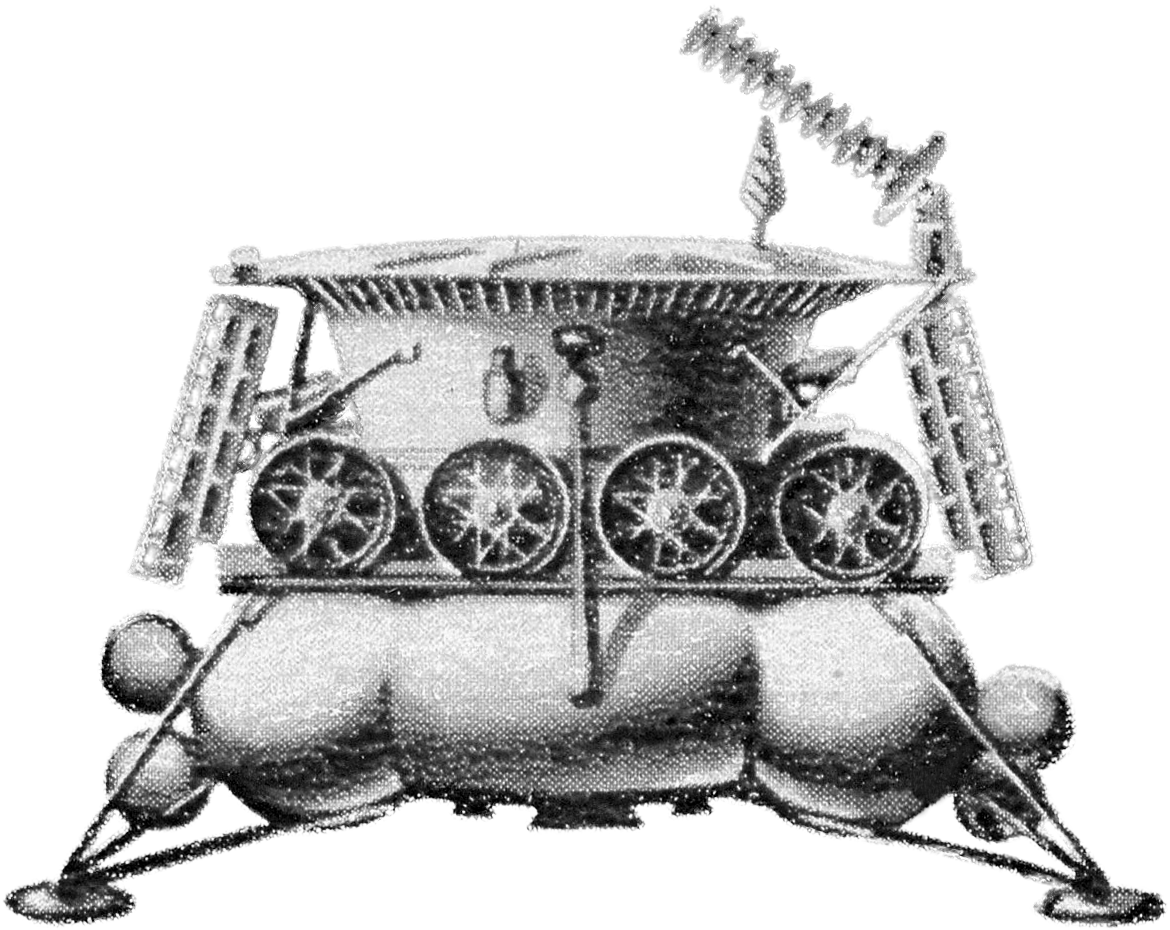
''Luna'' spacecraft with ''Lunokhod'' payload

Luna 21 carried the second successful Soviet lunar rover, Lunokhod 2, and was launched less than a month after the last Apollo lunar landing. The Proton-K/D launcher put the spacecraft into Earth parking orbit followed by translunar injection. On 12 January 1973, Luna 21 was braked into a 90 × 100 km orbit about the Moon, at a 60° inclination. On 13 and 14 January, the perilune was lowered to 16 km altitude. On 15 January after 40 orbits, the braking rocket was fired at 16 km altitude, and the craft went into free fall. At an altitude of 750 meters the main thrusters began firing, slowing the fall until a height of 22 meters was reached. At this point the main thrusters shut down and the secondary thrusters ignited, slowing the fall until the lander was 1.5 meters above the surface, where the engine was cut off. Landing occurred at 23:35 UT in Le Monnier crater at 25.85° N, 30.45° E, between Mare Serenitatis ("Sea of Serenity") and the Taurus Mountains. The lander carried a bas-relief of Vladimir Lenin and the Soviet coat-of-arms.

Less than three hours later, at 01:14 UT on 16 January, the rover disembarked onto the lunar surface. The 840 kilogram Lunokhod 2 was an improved version of its predecessor and was equipped with a third TV camera, an improved eight-wheel traction system, and additional scientific instrumentation. By the end of its first lunar day, Lunokhod 2 had already traveled further than Lunokhod 1 in its entire operational life. On 9 May, the rover inadvertently rolled into a crater and dust covered its solar panels and radiators, disrupting temperatures in the vehicle. Attempts to save the rover failed, and on 3 June, the Soviet news agency announced that its mission was over. Before last contact, the rover took 80,000 TV pictures and 86 panoramic photos and had performed hundreds of mechanical and chemical surveys of the soil. The Soviets later revealed that during a conference on planetary exploration in Moscow, 29 January to 2 February 1973 (that is, after the landing of Luna 21), an American scientist had given photos of the lunar surface around the Luna 21 landing site to a Soviet engineer in charge of the Lunokhod 2 mission. These photos, taken prior to the Apollo 17 landing, were later used by the "driver team" to navigate the new rover on its mission on the Moon

- Launch Date/Time: 1973-01-08 at 06:55:38 UTC
- On-orbit dry mass: 4850 kg

== Present ownership ==
Luna 21 and Lunokhod 2, still on the Moon, were purchased by Richard Garriott in December 1993 at a Sotheby's auction in New York.

== See also ==
- Lunokhod 2
- Lunokhod programme
- Timeline of artificial satellites and space probes
- List of artificial objects on the Moon
- List of missions to the Moon
