= Sigvalue =

Telecommunications billing software company

SigValue Technologies Ltd.
- Industry: Software Telecommunications
- Founded: 2000
- Founder: Yuval Mayron and Eli Yardeni
- Defunct: 2007
- Fate: Acquired
- Successor: Amdocs
- Headquarters: Hod Hasharon, Israel
- Products: Telecommunications billing
- Website: www.sigvalue.com

SigValue Technologies Ltd. is a provider of Telecommunications billing software for the prepaid market; owned by Amdocs.

== History ==
SigValue (2000-2016) was founded in Hod Hasharon, Israel in April 2000, by Yuval Mayron and Eli Yardeni. The company initially developed a prepaid solutions for mobile communications. It one of the most famous exits in Israeli start-ups since the crises of 2001.

SigValue's platform is aimed at service providers in emerging markets, such as Eastern Europe, Africa, Latin America and Asia, where the telecommunications customer base is predominantly composed of mobile prepaid subscribers. SigValue's platform combined the basic functions required for billing and customer care with a service control function, offering a single system that supports multiple networks, multiple services and all lines of business.

On February 7, 2007 SigValue was acquired by Amdocs, a customer management software vendor, for $54 Million USD. Amdocs already owned a 14 percent stake in SigValue. Other investors included: AIG Orion Fund, Holland Ventures, and the Singapore-Israel Industrial R&D Foundation; at the time the company had approximately 75 employees.

On September 1, 2016 amdocs closed SigValue (NBU) and opened a new department called Optima, Optima will be a combination of NBU and comverse kenan. some NBU employees got fired during the change.

== See also ==
- Silicon Wadi
