= PT Pasifik Satelit Nusantara =

Indonesian company

- Trade name: Pasifik Satelit Nusantara; PSN
- Industry: Telecommunications
- Founded: 1991
- Headquarters: Bekasi, West Java
- Key people: Adi Rahman Adiwoso, CEO
- Products: Satellite-based telecommunications
- Website: www.psn.co.id

PT Pasifik Satelit Nusantara (PSN) is a private Indonesian satellite telecommunications company.

It was formed in 1991 and was the first satellite-based telecommunications company in Indonesia. In 1995, a collaboration started what was to become ACeS (Asia Cellular Satellite system). In 1998, a WAN-based service for corporate customers was introduced. In 1996, it became the first Indonesian company to be listed on the Nasdaq stock exchange.

In 2019, the company launched Nusantara Satu, Indonesia's first broadband satellite that uses high-throughput satellite technology for a greater bandwidth capacity to provide broadband access services to all regions of Indonesia.

== Nusantara Satu ==
Nusantara Satu (formerly known as PSN-6) is a communications satellite. It is a large high-throughput satellite to provide voice and data communications, and broadband Internet throughout the Indonesian archipelago and Southeast Asia. Nusantara Satu was built by Space Systems Loral and was launched in February 2019 on a Falcon 9 launch vehicle along with the private Beresheet Moon lander and S5, a small satellite by the Air Force Research Laboratory (AFRL).

== Nusantara-H1-A ==
Nusantara-H1-A is a 16U cubesat launching as a rideshare with ViaSat-3 on a Falcon Heavy launch no earlier than March 2023. The purpose is to retain Ka- and Ku-band rights to a geostationary orbital slot. After a minimum 3 months to satisfy 'bring into use' requirements it will move to another location.

== SATRIA-1 ==
SATRIA-1 is an Indonesian geostationary VHTS (Very High Throughput Satellite) communications satellite built by Thales Alenia Space (TAS). It is a geostationary communications satellite at 146° East. It was launched on a Falcon 9 Block 5 on 19 June 2023. Thales Alenia Space started developing the Ka-band spacecraft in September 2020. The project has secured about US$545 million in funding, partly backed by Bpifrance export-credit agency of France. As prime contractor, Thales Alenia Space will deliver the satellite based on its Spacebus-Neo full electric platform and fitted with a fifth-generation digital processor (5G).

== Nusantara Lima ==
Nusantara Lima, or Nusantara-5, will augment the capacity of SATRIA. It was originally expected to launch in 2023 but was delayed. Nusantara Lima launched successfully on board a Falcon 9 Block 5 on the 12th of September 2025.
