= Zalul Environmental Association =

Zalul
- Founded: 1999
- Purpose: Environmentalism
- Location: Ramat Gan, Israel
- Region served: Israel
- Method: Public awareness, Legal action, Legislative action, Media, lobbying, Research
- Website: http://www.zalul.org.il

Zalul Environmental Association (Or in short "Zalul",צלול, lit:clear) is an Israeli environmental group founded in 1999 with the goal protecting the seas and rivers of Israel through conservation, activism, research, awareness-raising and education. Zalul seeks to put a stop to the spillage of sewage and other toxic waste into Israel's rivers through legal and legislative reforms.

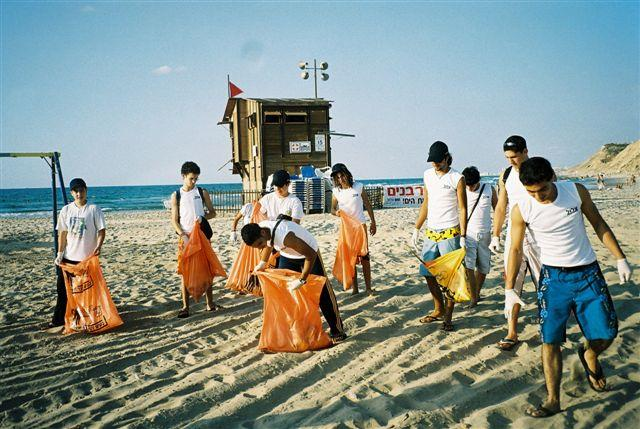
Beach-cleaning campaign

== Projects and campaigns ==
Zalul has worked to save the coral reef in the Gulf of Eilat and rescue the Naaman River near Acre, Israel. The coral reef campaign led to the creation of a safety phosphate mechanism in the port of Eilat and improvements to the city's sewage system. Fish cages in the Gulf of Eilat that were deemed harmful to the life of the reef will be removed from the sea.

Large-scale demonstrations have been held protesting the pollution of the Kishon. Zalul's report has prompted the Ministry of the Environment to investigate the problem and introduce clean-up measures.

The Naaman river near Acre in northern Israel has been polluted by factory waste. Zalul's campaign resulted in the construction of Acco's first sewage treatment facility.

Zalul drew public attention to frequent sewage spills into the sea in Herzliya, near some of the country's most popular beaches.

Shafdan, Israel's major waste-treatment facility and one of the largest in the world, was spilling sludge into the Mediterranean. Zalul's protest campaign culminated in legal action against Shafdan.

“Don’t Say Kaddish for the Lachish” is Zalul’s slogan for a campaign to save the Lachish River, which runs between the cities of Ashkelon and Ashdod.

Zalul's petition against the operation of the ALA Pipeline, which was spilling sewage into the Gulf of Acco was signed by over 10,000 Acco residents.

== Education and outreach ==
Keeping with Zalul's goal of providing concrete solutions for better environmental policy, the Environmental Economics Outreach Center serves as an environmental economic advocacy and advisory body. Recognizing the need for educational programs to promote beach and marine ecosystem protection, Zalul is developing curriculum and lesson plans for schools and youth groups. The materials are distributed in Hebrew and Arabic.

== Awards ==
Benjamin Kahn, chairman of the association was named, "Hero of the Environment" by TIME Magazine for Zalul's efforts to safeguard Eilat's coral reef.
