= Golden Pages =

Company publishing telephone directories of businesses

- Headquarters: Belgium, Czech Republic, Ireland, Israel, Netherlands, Uzbekistan, Bulgaria, Romania
- Products: Telephone directory of businesses

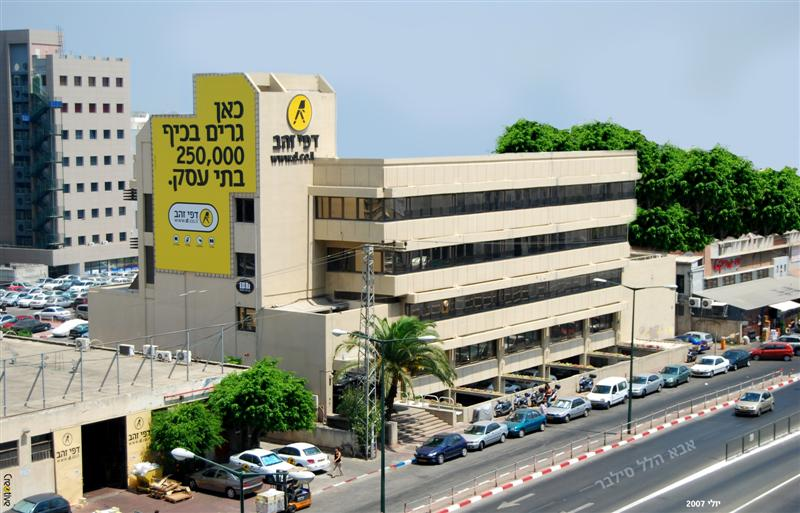
Golden Pages building in Ramat Gan, Israel

Golden Pages (Hebrew: דפי זהב, romanized: Dapei Zahav) is a company which publishes a telephone directory of businesses categorized according to product or service. Business listings are printed on yellow paper as opposed to white paper for non-commercial and private phone numbers.

Golden Pages is published in Belgium, Czech Republic, Ireland, Israel, Netherlands, Uzbekistan, Bulgaria and Romania. The publishing companies in these countries are not necessarily related.

== Israel ==
Golden Pages Israel was founded by Morris Kahn in 1968, distributing three directories in Tel Aviv, Haifa and Jerusalem. Originally a subsidiary of the international Yellow Pages company, it was divested due to the Arab League boycott of Israel – because of the company's desire to enter the Saudi Arabian market. It was quietly sold to Kahn who developed it into a large multinational telecom-related business, from which he spun off Amdocs in 1982.

Golden Pages Group Ltd. is engaged in the publication of yellow page directories. Its products included printed and online directories, mobile services, and other digital-based applications. Part of Golden Pages Group Ltd., Golden Pages Publications Ltd. is an Israeli company located in Ramat Gan that publishes yellow pages and related web-based search engines. Markstone Capital Partners LP (Israel's largest private equity fund with just under $800million under management at that time) acquired Golden Pages Publications Ltd. from Aurec Group on 29 Oct 04 for $111.70 million.

Markstone developed a new business strategy and recruited a largely new management team to GPM. Ron Lubash and Amir Kess acted as joint chairmen of GPM, supported by deputy chairman Lars Guldstrand, and Chief Executive Officer Mr. Nir Lempert.

The Company has developed to Israel's leading yellow page, local search and directory-related company. The GPM group includes Golden Pages, Israel's yellow pages business, which is the dominant directory franchise in the country, as well as several other complementary print and online businesses, including ZAP, a comparative shopping website, REST, a restaurant directory business, Pro group, a student portal, and 55% of Dun & Bradstreet Israel, a business directory.

Babcock & Brown Capital Ltd. (BCM) purchased 100% of the Golden Pages Group Ltd in August 2007 from Markstone Capital Group LLC. The acquisition price for 100% of the equity of GPM was approximately U.S. $123 million representing an enterprise value of approximately U.S.$215 million.

BCM an externally managed investment vehicle listed on the Australian Securities Exchange intends to continue to support GPM's existing growth strategy, including funding GPM in making further acquisitions, and helping GPM to explore offshore growth and acquisition opportunities. All key management will remain with the GPM businesses under their ownership. The largest competitor is Bezeq, which launched a rival internet service in July 2008. The directory lists 250,000 businesses.

The slogan of the company "תן לאצבעות ללכת במקומך" (Ten LeEtzba'ot Lelekhet BeMkomkha), parallel to the English "let your fingers do the walking" has become an idiom in Hebrew, and means to do the work with your phone or computer instead of running around.

== See also ==
- Yellow pages
- Aurec Group
