= Beit Yanai =

Moshav in central Israel

Beit Yanai: בֵּית יַנַּאי (Hebrew); بيت يناي (Arabic)
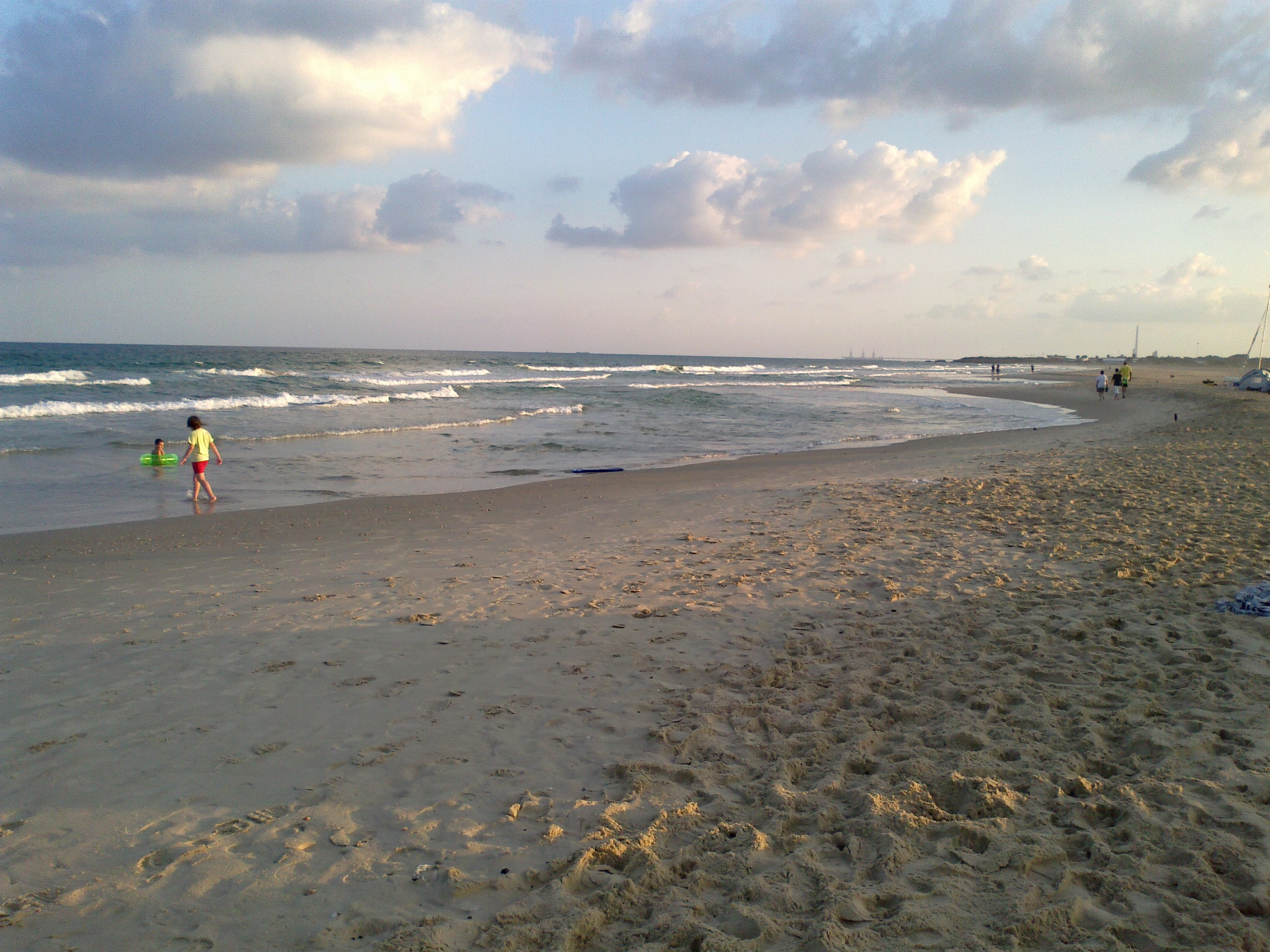

- Location within Central Israel Location within Israel
- Coordinates: 32°22′47″N 34°51′47″E
- Country: Israel
- District: Central
- Subdistrict: HaSharon
- Council: Hefer Valley
- Region: Sharon plain
- Affiliation: Agricultural Union
- Founded: 1933
- Founder: Lithuanian and Polish Jews
- Population (2024): 335

Beit Yanai (Hebrew: בֵּית יַנַּאי, lit. House of Yanai) is a moshav in central Israel. Located in the Sharon plain on the shore of the Mediterranean Sea around six kilometres north of Netanya, it falls under the jurisdiction of Hefer Valley Regional Council. In 2024 it had a population of 335.

== History ==
The moshav was founded in 1933 by Jewish immigrants from Lithuania and Poland, and was named after Alexander Jannaeus (known in Hebrew as Alexander Yanai) the Hasmonean king. There were several Americans among the original settlers.

A jetty, built in 1938 for unloading cargo, is located to the north of the moshav. The Altalena was anchored there, and it was used for exporting citrus fruits.

It later absorbed more immigrants from South Africa. By 1947 it had over 100 residents.

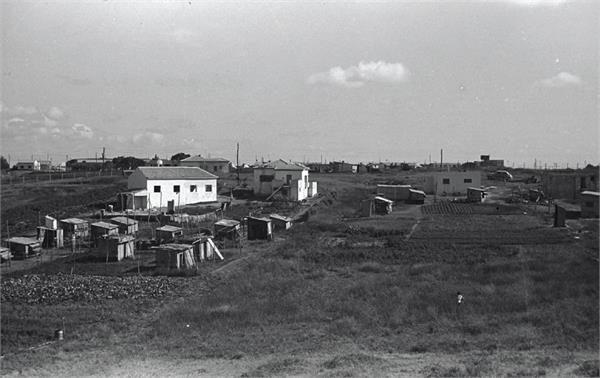
Beit Yanai 1947

== Notable residents ==
- Morris Kahn
