= Openet =

Openet Telecom, Inc.
- Industry: telecommunication-software
- Founded: Dublin, Ireland (1999)
- Headquarters: Dublin, Ireland
- Key people: Niall Norton, CEO; Joe Hogan, Founder and CTO
- Products: Policy Manager, Evolved Charging, Convergent Mediation, Interaction Gateway
- Number of employees: 960 (2013)
- Website: www.openet.com

Openet was a software vendor with corporate headquarters in Dublin, Ireland, and two regional headquarters in Malaysia and the United States with offices worldwide. Openet products are used by telecommunications service providers to commercialize and analyze activity on their network by processing customers' data usage. Openet was acquired by Amdocs in 2020.

== History ==
The company was founded in 1999 by Joe Hogan and Declan Conway, both ex-Retix Ireland employees. It received its initial funding from Cross Atlantic Technology Fund (XATF), which invested US$2.7 million for a 13.0% stake.

As of 2013, it had more than 900 employees and more than 80 customers in 32 countries. By 2011, Openet reportedly had an 11 percent share of the wireless policy management software market. Openet's product suite consists of Policy Manager, Evolved Charging, Interaction Gateway and Convergent Mediation. Respondents to a December 2012 survey by Infonetics Research identified Openet, Tekelec and Huawei as the top three policy management vendors.

In August 2010, Amdocs initiated a legal complaint against Openet, alleging the company violated two of its patents. Two additional patents were added to the case in January 2011. In the United States, a Virginia District judge Leonie Brinkema ruled in Openet's favour in February 2012, finding that Openet did not infringe on Amdocs' patents. The judgment was reversed on appeal in Amdocs (Israel) Ltd. v. Openet Telecom, Inc. and case was settled in April 2018.

In July 2020, Amdocs announced its plan to acquire Openet. The boards of directors of Openet and Amdocs approved the transaction for net consideration of approximately $180 million in cash which, subject to the satisfaction of the conditions to closing. The acquisition had completed by August 2020.
