= Cramer Systems =

Software company in United Kingdom

Cramers System Group Ltd.
- Type: Subsidiary
- Industry: telecommunications
- Genre: OSS systems for telecom providers
- Founded: 1996; 30 years ago, in England
- Founder: Jon Craton, Mark Farmer, Don Gibson
- Headquarters: Bath, (Technology Centre), England
- Products: OSS systems
- Services: software development and consultancy
- Parent: Amdocs
- Website: www.amdocs.com/Products/OSS

Cramer Systems Group Ltd. is a British telecommunications firm, founded in 1996 by Jon Craton, Mark Farmer and Don Gibson. The firm developed Operations support systems (OSSs) for the telecommunication industry clients such as Vodafone, KPN Telecom, and British Telecom. In August 2006 Amdocs announced the completion of the acquisition of the company. The products developed by Cramer have now been integrated into the Amdocs product suite. The company name is a combination of three letters from the names of Craton and Farmer.

== Products ==
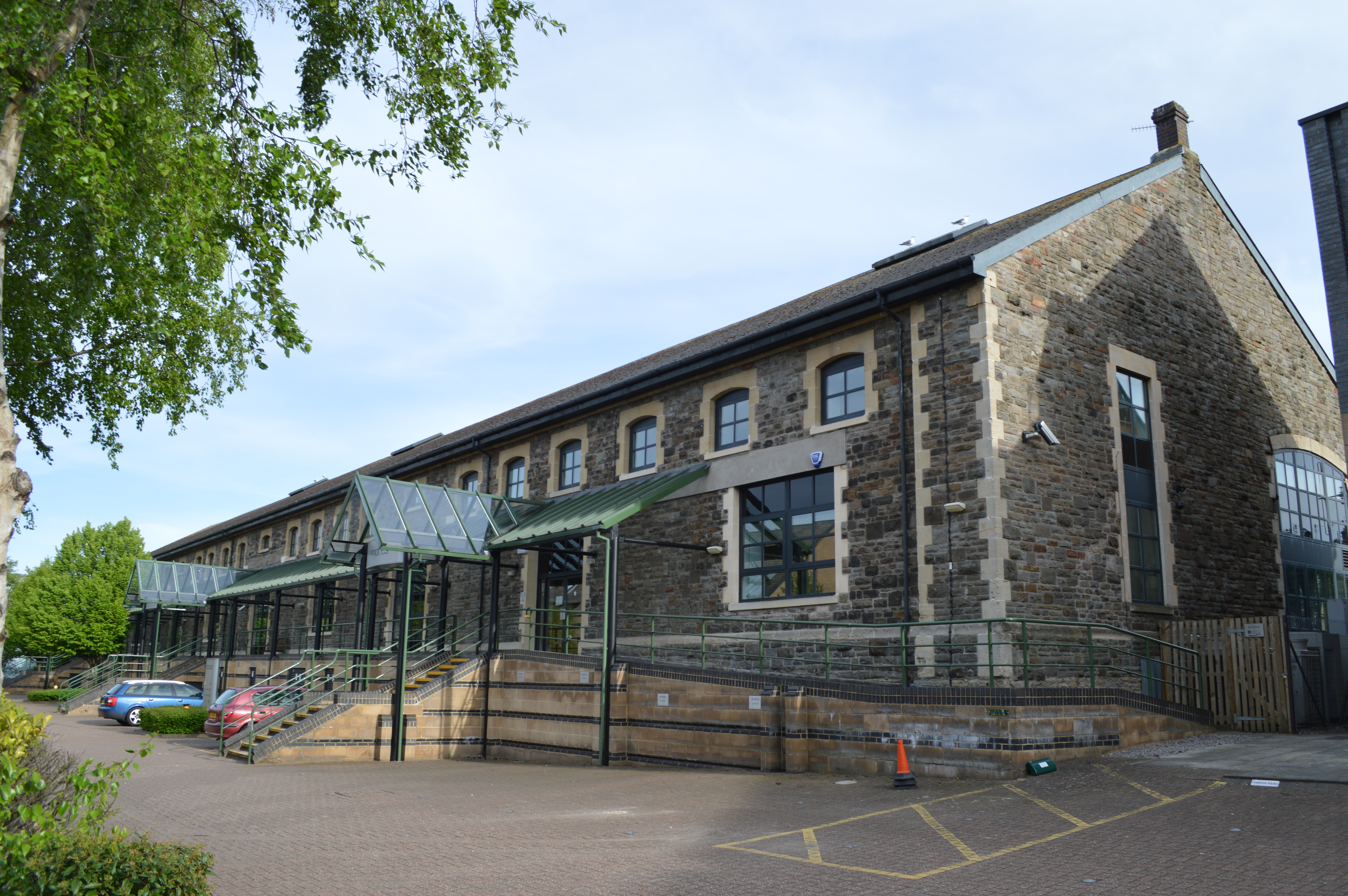
Cramer Systems office at the former Westmoreland Road goods yard in Bath

The company produced the Cramer OSS Suite, a set of applications built around Resource Manager, an inventory of a company's telecommunications network infrastructure and configuration. This includes equipment such as switches, routers, Synchronous optical networking (SDH), and Plesiochronous Digital Hierarchy (PDH) nodes, and Customer-premises equipment (CPEs), but also cables, buildings, rooms, cabinets, and other such furniture. Originally developed to administer networks such as SDH and PDH, the product grew to encompass many modern telecommunications technologies. A key feature of the product was being 'service aware': not only knowing what equipment is installed, the system knows what each system, module, card, interface or cable can do, which circuits or connections are configured on the network and which customer services use these connections.

Additional modules grew to include: Task Engine, for complex "design and assign" task automation and basic workflow management; Delivery Engine, to manage complex change control (planning, plan execution including external workforce management system integration, reporting); Sync Engine, used to prevent mismatches between the information in the inventory system and the live network; Discovery Engine, to retrieve configuration information from network devices and element managers; Activation Engine, to provision network resources; Service Manager & Service Catalog, to take requests for services from a catalog, and convert them into requests in Delivery Engine and Task Engine; Route Finder, to identify physically redundant paths through the network; Class of Service manager, used to manage IP network policies; Site Manager, used to model and manage physical layout of exchanges, datacenters, their power and cooling; IT Manager, used to model services running on servers and virtual machines; Partition Manager, used to provide "multi-tenant" like data security; and numerous integration points to other OSS systems, such as Inventory Import/Export, FCAPS alarm enrichment, and others.

The latest two versions of the OSS suite used Java as middleware platform for the GUI and some interfaces or adapters between the suite and external systems.

== Acquisition by Amdocs ==
Although Cramer was acquired by Amdocs in August 2006, the development of their products continues and is still based at their technology center in Bath, England. The company continue to exist as the operations support systems (OSS) department of the much larger BSS developer Amdocs.
