= Beresheet 2 =

Israeli lunar lander

- Website: www.spaceil.com

Spacecraft properties
- Spacecraft: Beresheet 2
- Spacecraft type: Lunar landers and orbiter
- Manufacturer: SpaceIL; Firefly Aerospace (lander)

Start of mission
- Launch date: Mission suspended. Launch was planned for 2025

Beresheet 2 was a proposed private space mission intended to land two spacecraft on the Moon. Upon reaching the Moon, the spacecraft would split into three: an orbiter and two landers that would be released for landing at different locations on the Moon. The orbiter would continue to orbit the Moon on a long-term multi-year mission. This would be the first-ever dual-lander deployment mission, with the smallest landers to ever soft-land on the Moon. It would have a budget of US$100 million, similar to that of Beresheet, and would include more international collaboration, with the United Arab Emirates and Italy among countries expressing interest. The project was planned to include a substantial component of educational activities and an outreach program for the public in the partnering countries. As of 2025, the mission was suspended due to lack of funding.

== History ==
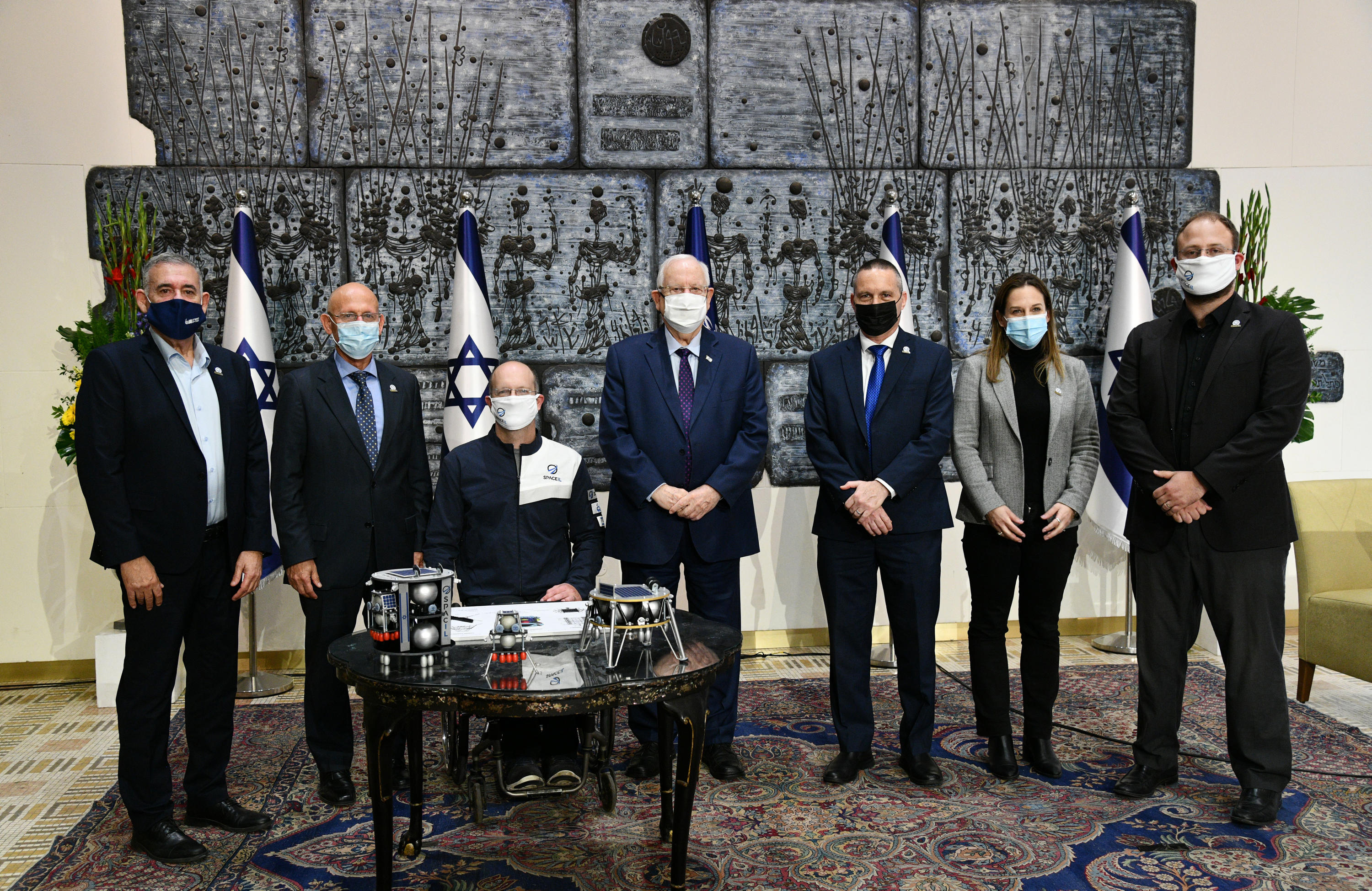
Reuven Rivlin hosting the launch event of the Beresheet 2 project, December 2020. In the background is an Israeli artwork made of crushed basalt.

The mission was announced by the SpaceIL voluntary association, shortly after the conclusion of the first Beresheet mission in April 2019. It was announced on 26 June 2019, that the mission will not target the Moon, and instead it will be to another undisclosed object. On 25 November 2019, it was simultaneously announced that the Moon would indeed be the target of Beresheet 2, and that SpaceIL plans to send another lander to Mars.

On 16 January 2020, SpaceIL announced that they have officially started to work on Beresheet 2, as they were given the first million-dollar funding for the spacecraft. On 5 February 2020, Shimon Sarid was appointed as CEO of SpaceIL. In this role, Sarid would lead the Beresheet 2 project. In July 2020, engineer Yoav Heichal, former chief engineer of Better Place Ltd, has joined the program as a structural engineer. The program was officially launched by Israel's former president, Reuven Rivlin, on 9 December 2020 and announced that the Beresheet 2 Moon mission would launch in 2024, consisting of an orbiter and two landers. SpacelL was leading the program with the support of the Israel Space Agency.

In July 2021, the Beresheet 2 program raised 70 million dollars from a group of donors: the Patrick & Lina Drahi family foundation, Morris Kahn, and the Moshal Space Foundation. At World Space Week in Dubai in October 2021, Israel and the UAE ministers of science and technology announced plans for cooperation on the mission. In January 2025, Israel Space Agency and Italian Space Agency signed a memorandum of understanding for collaboration on the mission, but any joint budget for the mission had not been decided.

In April 2025, SpaceIL suspended the work on the Beresheet 2 Moon mission after failing to secure funding.
