= Morris Kahn =

Israeli billionaire businessman (1930–2026)

- מוריס קאן
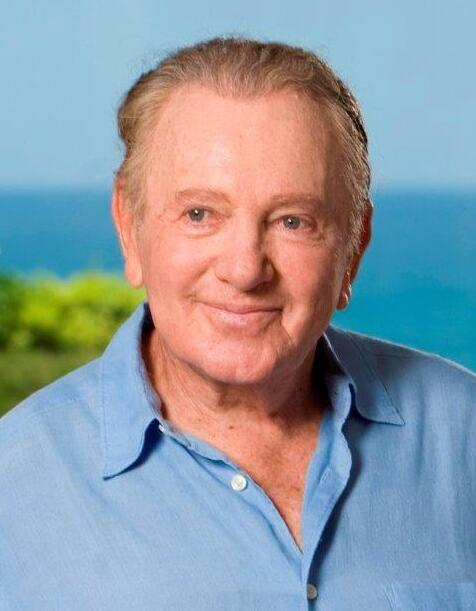
- Born: 5 March 1930; Benoni, South Africa
- Died: 1 January 2026 (aged 95); Israel
- Occupation: Businessman
- Known for: Founder and chairman of Aurec Group
- Spouse: Jackie Maloon (died 2011)
- Children: 2, including Benjamin Kahn

Morris Kahn (Hebrew: מוריס קאן; 5 March 1930 – 1 January 2026) was an Israeli billionaire businessman. He was the founder of Golden Pages Israel, Amdocs, the Aurec Group, Coral World and other companies. Through Coral World, he founded several marine parks around the world, including an underwater observatory in Eilat, Israel. As of August 2025, his net worth was estimated at US$1.1 billion, making him one of the world's poorest billionaires.

== Early life ==
Morris Kahn was born in March 1930 in Benoni, South Africa, to a Jewish family from Lithuania. He is the eldest child of Philip and Beattie Kahn. He was an active member of the Zionist youth group, Habonim.

In 1956, Kahn moved from South Africa to Israel with his wife, Jacqueline (Jackie) Maloon, and their two sons, Benjamin and David.

== Business ventures ==
Kahn’s business career in Israel began with a few business ventures, including a bicycle factory in Beit Shemesh in partnership with Kibbutz Tzora; and a cattle company in the Northern Galilee.

In 1978 Kahn and Shmuel Meitar founded the Aurec Group, an Israeli-based private equity firm which started with investments in the cable and telecom sectors. This led to the installation of a fiber optic cable from Israel to Italy, which connected Israel to the rest of the world.

His first major success began with the establishment of the Golden Pages telephone directory in Israel in 1968, which led to the co-founding of Amdocs in 1982, together with Shmuel and Tzvi Meitar. Amdocs provides customer relationship management and billing software for big telecommunications firms. The company, which is traded on NASDAQ (revenue in fiscal 2015: $3.6 billion) currently serves more than 300 clients in more than 90 countries, and has about 26,000 employees.

Aurec also owned Golden Channels, Israel's first cable company, founded in 1989 and Golden Lines, Israel's first international communications company, founded in 1996.

In 1997 the Aurec Group acquired 50% of Netcom, the launch of AIG Golden Insurance and Alpha Visa-Card.

Kahn was a principal investor in Aurum Ventures and the clean tech water company Atlantium, that uses UV rays to disinfect water, and N-Trig, a manufacturer of multi-touch screens for computers. In 2016 Aurum Ventures invested $3 million in a new method of diagnosing cancer developed by Noklaiks (Nucleix) Israel.

Time to Know is a digital education platform which Kahn first launched as a nonprofit organization focused on improving grade school education.

Kahn, a former diver, founded Coral World International, a group of aquariums around the world in Eilat, Israel; Maui, Hawaii; Perth, Australia; St. Thomas, US Virgin Islands; Coral Island Nassau, The Bahamas; Oceanworld in Manly, Australia; and elsewhere.

== Philanthropy ==
Kahn supported the work of Save a Child's Heart (SACH), an organization that brings Israeli doctors around the world to perform life-saving surgery and medical monitoring for children of all races, religions, nationalities, and economic status.

The Morris Kahn Initiative is a $4 million program to help develop pioneering cancer research at Tel Aviv University. The initiative’s aim is to develop 3D cancer modeling of live cancer tumors.

"Big Data Maccabi", founded with contributions from Kahn, aims to help medical professionals diagnose illness using the information collected during blood tests, imaging and other diagnostic testing.

He supported Serious Fun, a camp for children with terminal illness, and a therapeutic horse-riding camp for the disabled.

Kahn founded Zalul in 1999, a non-profit foundation which cleans bodies of water in Israel.

Kahn was also the main donor of SpaceIL, the first private company that managed a lunar mission - Beresheet. Beresheet was the first Israeli mission in deep space, the spacecraft was launched on the SpaceX Falcon 9 Launcher and it was aimed to land on the Moon on 11 April 2019. The attempt was unsuccessful, the spacecraft crashed into the Moon. The mission was still seen as a success.

Kahn was a supporter of Ben-Gurion University and the National Institute for Biotechnology of the Negev.

The Morris Kahn Institute for Human Immunology was funded by Kahn.

In conjunction with the Weizman Institute, he founded the Kahn Family Research Center for Systems Biology of the Human Cell.

Kahn supported the Morris Kahn and Maccabi Health Data Science Institute, to create a database for the 2.5 million members of the Maccabi Healthcare Services organization.

He sponsored an Omo Valley and Jinka, Ethiopia-based project, Jinka Eye Camp, for volunteer Israeli surgeons to perform operations to restore eyesight to people living in rural villages suffering from eye diseases such as cataracts and trachoma.

== Personal life and death ==
Kahn was married to Jacqueline until her death in 2011. They had two sons, David and Benjamin Kahn, a marine biologist, who was a Time Magazine hero for his work on the environment.

Kahn lived in Beit Yanai, north of Tel Aviv. He died in Israel on 1 January 2026, at the age of 95.

== Honours ==
Kahn was named honorary president of the 20th Maccabiah by Maccabi World Union in November 2016, and opened the Games in July 2017 in Jerusalem.

Bar-Ilan University awarded Kahn an honorary doctorate for his support, bringing labs and equipment to the university.

In 2018, Kahn was given a Bonei Zion Prize Lifetime Achievement Award.

In 2019 Kahn was honored as one of the torchbearers in the national Israeli Independence Day ceremony.

Kahn was awarded honorary doctorates by Tel Aviv University in 2023, and the University of Haifa in 2024.
