= Aurec Group =

Israeli cable and telecom holding company

Aurec Group (from Latin: Aurum - gold, or from Hebrew: עורק - artery), is an Israeli holding company that includes cable and telecom investments. It was established in 1968 by Morris Kahn.

== History ==
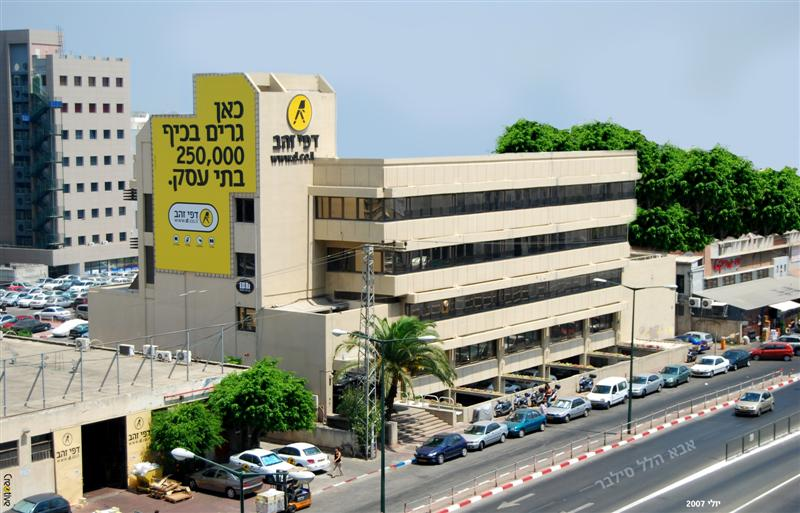
Dapei Zahav building

Aurec Group was founded by Morris Kahn, who immigrated to Israel from South Africa in 1956 and was on the Forbes list of billionaires.

Amongst the group's holdings have been Golden Pages (the Israeli Yellow Pages), the former cable television provider Golden Channels (now amalgamated into Hot); an internet service provider named Golden Lines (now merged with Internet Zahav to form 012 Smile); and AIG Golden (a joint venture with the AIG insurance company) and Amdocs, now a leading provider of software and services for billing, customer relationship management (CRM), operations support systems (OSS) to the telecommunications industry.

In 1999, Aurec sold off its holdings in the Arutzei Zahav cable company to its partners, Eliezer Fishman and Yedioth Ahronoth, for US$40 million. In 2000, Kahn also sold 51.5 percent of the Aurec Group's holdings in Golden Lines (Kavei Zahav) to Fishman, for $180 million. Also in 2000, Aurec divested itself of its 50 percent holding in Netcom, a smaller provider of data communications networks. The value of the transaction was never revealed, but it is thought that Aurec received about $20 million for its shares.
