= Amdocs =

Israeli-founded software company

Amdocs Limited

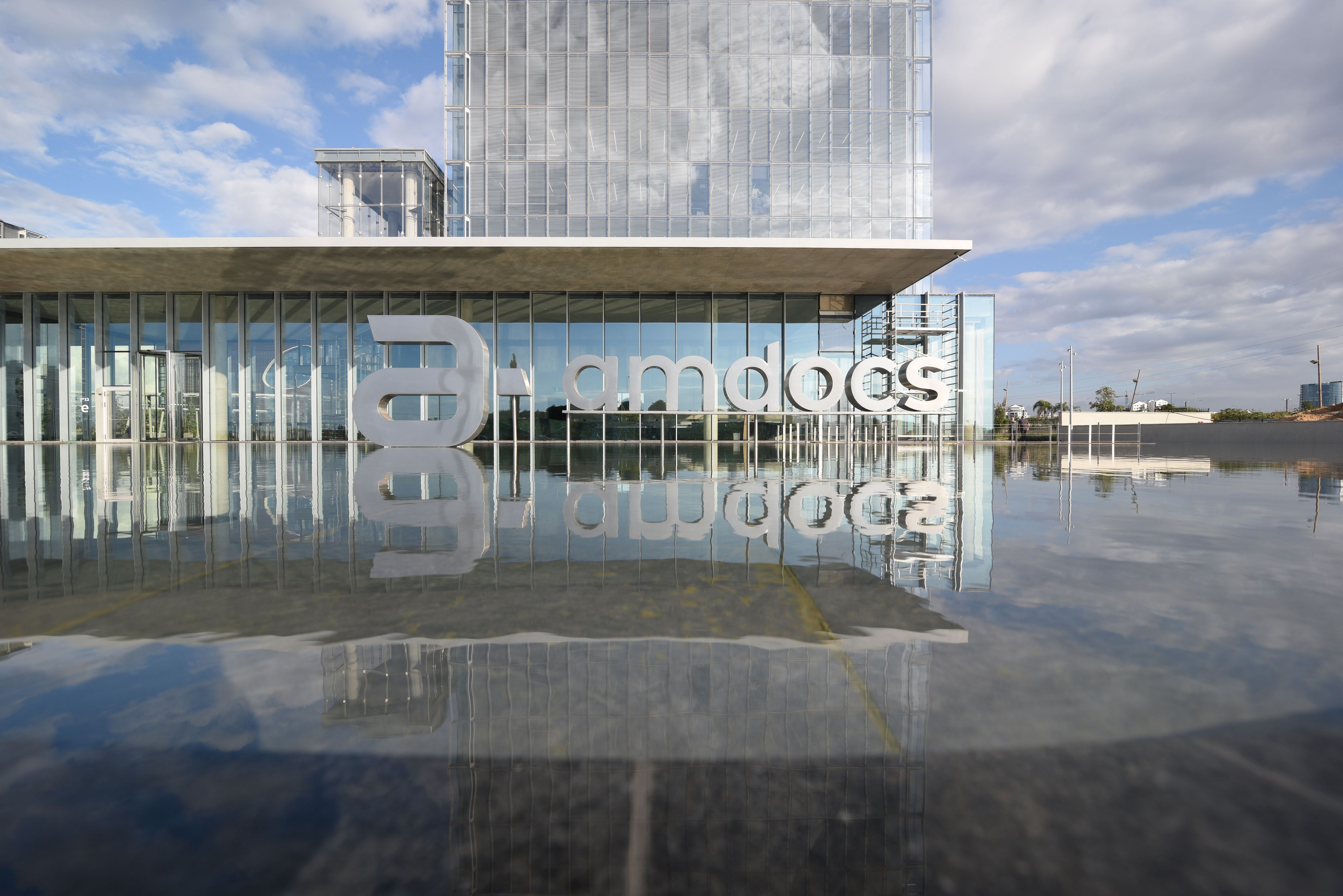
- Amdocs facility in Ra'anana, Israel in 2022
- Type: Public
- Traded as: Nasdaq: DOX; Russell 1000 component
- Industry: Telecommunications
- Predecessor: Aurec Information & Directory Systems
- Founded: 1982; 44 years ago in Israel
- Founders: Avinoam Naor; Boaz Dotan; Morris Kahn
- Headquarters: Chesterfield, Missouri, United States (corporate); Saint Peter Port, Guernsey (registered office)
- Key people: Shimie Hortig (CEO); Tal Rozenfeld (CFO)
- Revenue: ▼US$4.53 billion (2025)
- Operating income: ▲US$732 million (2025)
- Net income: ▲US$568 million (2025)
- Total assets: ▼US$6.25 billion (2025)
- Total equity: ▼US$3.47 billion (2025)
- Number of employees: 26,969 (2025)
- Website: amdocs.com

Amdocs Limited (Hebrew: אמדוקס) is a multinational telecommunications technology and Software company headquartered in Chesterfield, Missouri. The company specializes in software and services for communications, media, digital enterprises, and financial services providers. Amdocs was founded in 1982 and is publicly traded on the Nasdaq stock exchange.

== Overview ==
Amdocs provides software and services for communications service providers. The company operates in more than 90 countries, with its headquarters in St. Louis, Missouri, and has approximately 30,000 employees globally as of 2022. Shimie Hortig is the chief executive officer (CEO) and president. Amdocs has been traded on the Nasdaq global select market since December 2013.

== History ==
=== Early years and IPO ===
Amdocs was founded in 1982 in Israel as an offshoot of the Israeli phone directory company Golden Pages, which was owned by the Aurec Group headed by Morris Kahn. Together with others at Golden Pages, Kahn developed a billing software program for phone directory companies and with Boaz Dotan established a company called Aurec Information & Directory Systems to market this product. In 1982, Boaz Dotan became Amdocs' first President and CEO.

In 1985, Southwestern Bell Corporation acquired a 50 percent ownership share of Aurec Information & Directory Systems, and its name was changed to Amdocs. Within two years, the Aurec Group sold off all its holdings in Amdocs for almost US$1 billion. Between 1990 and 1995, Amdocs took its initial diversification steps, expanding first into the wireline telephony market and then the mobile space. Avi Naor replaced Dotan in 1995. In June 1998, Amdocs held an initial public offering on the New York Stock Exchange.

=== Expansion ===
Following its IPO, Amdocs expanded by acquiring additional billing and customer relationship management companies and building its application creation capabilities. In 1999, the company moved into managed services when it acquired International Telecommunication Data System Corporation. Companies acquired in the early 2000s include DST Innovis, XACCT Technologies, Cramer Systems, Sigvalue, and Canadian internet billing firm Solect. Dov Baharav succeeded Naor as CEO in 2002, and Eli Gelman held the role starting in November 2010.

In early 2000, federal agencies conducted a counterintelligence investigation to determine if Amdocs was being used by Israel to eavesdrop on U.S. government communications. The investigation found no evidence of such activity. Concerns were also raised about potential mishandling of data.

In 2005, Amdocs was suspected of industrial espionage when it hired a private investigator who allegedly spied on a Globes journalist. In 2009, the South African State Security Agency suspected Amdocs was being used by Mossad to spy on South African citizens.

Amdocs continued to expand via mergers and acquisitions in the 2010s, purchasing firms such as Bridgewater Systems in 2011, the business support system portion of Comverse Technology, and content monetization, processing and distribution software company Vubiquity in 2018, which it sold in 2026. Shuky Sheffer replaced Gelman as Amdocs' President and CEO in October 2018. In 2020, Amdocs acquired Openet, a provider of 5G charging, policy and cloud technologies. Amdocs further expanded into cloud computing in 2021 with the acquisitions of Sourced, a Canadian company specializing in cloud transitioning.

Amdocs launched a generative AI framework in 2023 called amAIz, designed for telecommunications service providers and built using Nvidia's AI foundry service, which runs on Microsoft Azure. The company has experimented with using the platform to process customer service inquiries. The same year, Amdocs acquired Astadia and TEOCO's Service Assurance line of business.

Shimie Hortig became Amdocs' President and CEO effective March 31, 2026 following the retirement of Shuky Sheffer.

== See also ==
- Matrix (protocol)
- VOIP telephony
- Amdocs (Israel) Ltd. v. Openet Telecom, Inc.
