= Beresheet =

Failed Israeli lunar lander

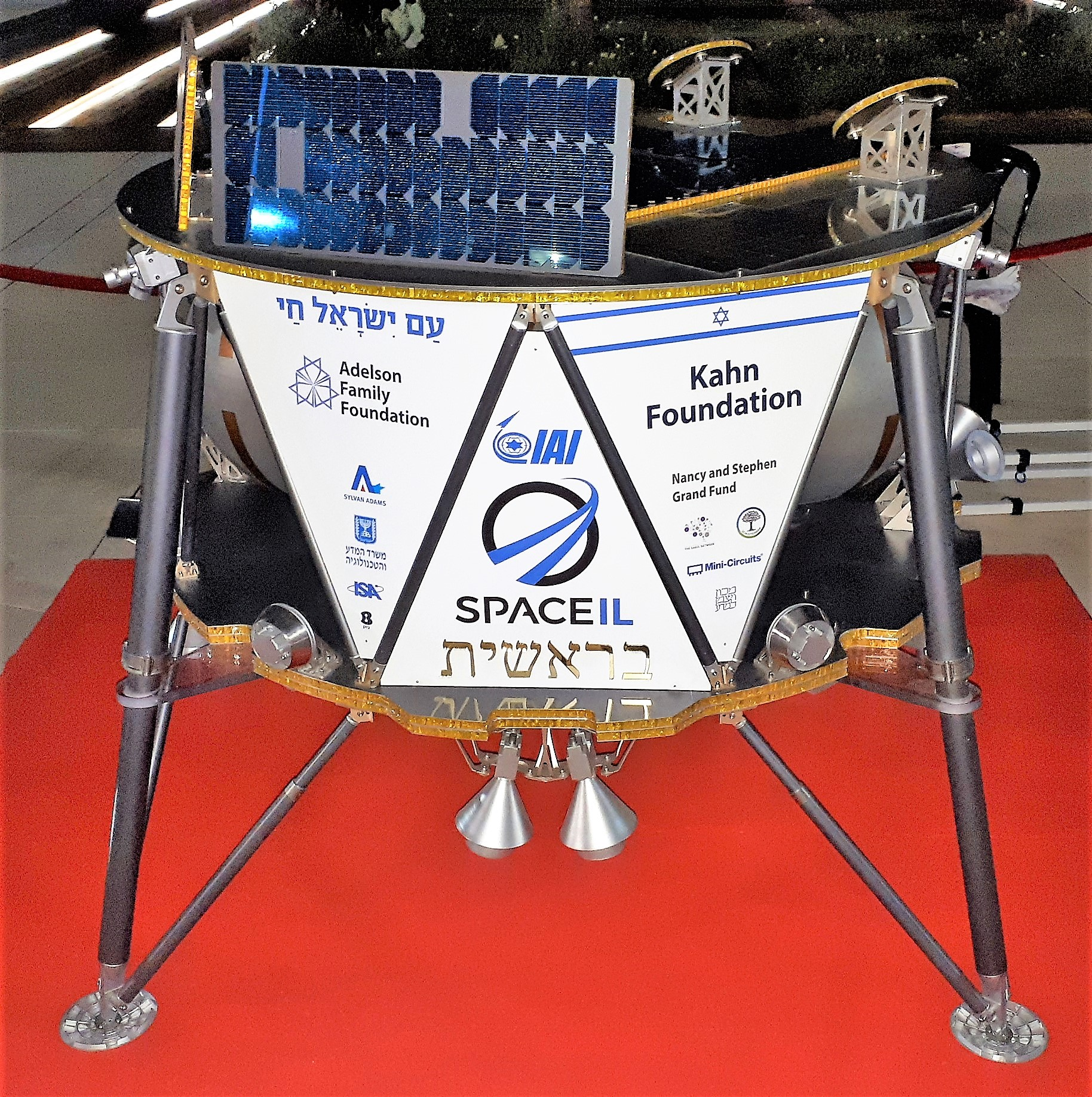
- Full-size model of the Beresheet moon lander
- Names: Sparrow (2011–2018)
- Mission type: Technology demonstration
- Operator: Israel Aerospace Industries and SpaceIL
- COSPAR ID: 2019-009B
- SATCAT no.: 44049
- Website: www.spaceil.com
- Mission duration: 48 days, 17 hours, 38 minutes (achieved)

Spacecraft properties
- Spacecraft: Beresheet
- Spacecraft type: Lunar lander
- Manufacturer: SpaceIL and Israel Aerospace Industries
- Launch mass: 585 kg
- Dry mass: 150 kg (330 lb)
- Dimensions: Diameter: 2 m (6 ft 7 in); Height: 1.5 m (4 ft 11 in)

Start of mission
- Launch date: 22 February 2019, 01:45 UTC
- Rocket: Falcon 9 B5
- Launch site: CCAFS, SLC-40
- Contractor: SpaceX

End of mission
- Disposal: Destroyed upon impact on the Moon surface
- Destroyed: 11 April 2019, 19:23 UTC

Moon lander
- Landing date: Lunar capture: 4 April 2019; Landing: 11 April 2019 (failure)
- Landing site: Mare Serenitatis; 32.5956°N 19.3496°E
Instruments
- Magnetometer
- Laser retroreflector array

Beresheet (Hebrew: בְּרֵאשִׁית, Bərēšīṯ, lit. 'In the beginning'; Book of Genesis) was a demonstrator of a small robotic lunar lander and lunar probe operated by SpaceIL and Israel Aerospace Industries. Its aims included inspiring youth and promoting careers in science, technology, engineering, and mathematics (STEM), and landing its magnetometer, time capsule, and laser retroreflector on the Moon. The lander's gyroscopes failed on 11 April 2019 causing the main engine to shut off, which resulted in the lander crashing on the Moon. Its final resting position is 32.5956°N, 19.3496°E.

The lander was previously known as Sparrow and was officially renamed to Beresheet in December 2018. Its net mass was 150 kg (330 lb); when fueled at launch, its mass was 585 kg (1,290 lb). It had been compared to a washing machine, as it stood at about the height of one at 1.5 m (4 ft 11 in) and was similar in width to large household appliances. It used seven ground stations for Earth–lander communication. Its mission control center was at Israel Aerospace Industries (IAI) in Yehud, Israel.

== Planning and construction ==
Beresheet was co-developed by SpaceIL and Israel Aerospace Industries (IAI) with support from Israel Space Agency and Morris Kahn, its major financier. It represented the first privately initiated Moon mission and was stimulated by the Google Lunar X Prize. SpaceIL and IAI constructed the vehicle and was supported by the Israel Space Agency. The time window for participation in the Google Lunar X Prize closed before the launch. After the mission, Lunar X Prize awarded a US$1 million award to SpaceIL to support a second mission.

The costs for the project, including launch, were about US$100 million. The government of Israel's commitment to the project was stated to be 10% in July 2018. However, in 2019 just before the launch, SpaceIL told media that the overall budget was about US$90 million, and only about US$2 million of that came from the Israeli government.

== Payload ==
The spacecraft carried a "time capsule" containing over 30 million pages of data, including a full copy of the English-language Wikipedia, the Wearable Rosetta disc, the PanLex database, the Torah, children's drawings, a children's book inspired by the space launch, memoirs of a Holocaust survivor, Israel's national anthem ("Hatikvah"), the Israeli flag, and a copy of the Israeli Declaration of Independence. At the last minute, genetic samples and tardigrades were added in epoxy resin between the digital layers.

Its scientific payload included a magnetometer supplied by the Israeli Weizmann Institute of Science to measure the local magnetic field, and a laser retroreflector array supplied by NASA's Goddard Space Flight Center to enable precise measurements of the Earth–Moon distance.

== Propulsion ==
The spacecraft propulsion system was designed and built by Israel Aerospace Industries, based on monomethylhydrazine (MMH) fuel and mixed oxides of nitrogen (MON) oxidizer. It featured nine engines, the main engine was the LEROS 2b liquid-propellant, restartable rocket engine which was used to reach lunar orbit, deceleration of the spacecraft, and an attempted propulsive landing.

== Launch ==
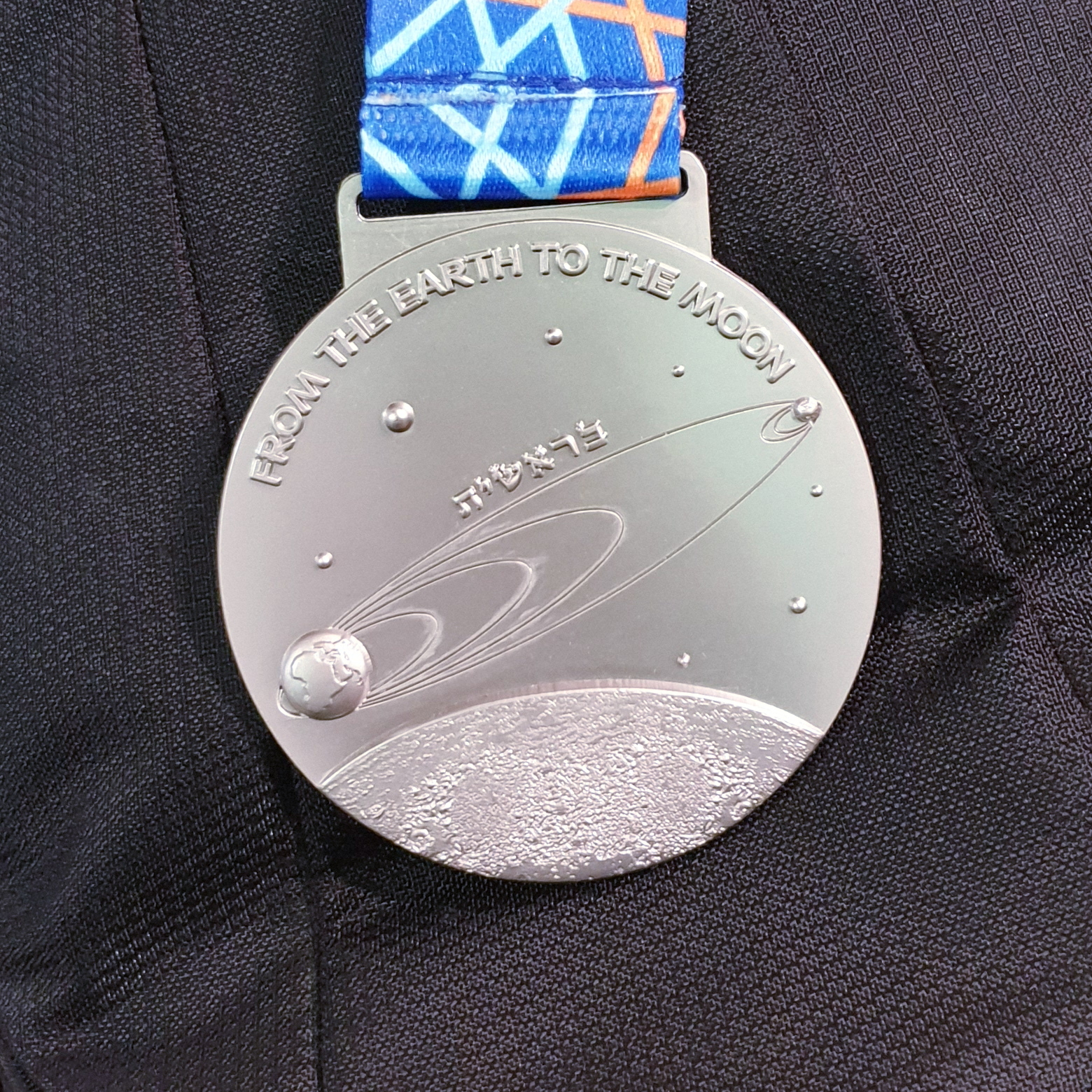
Trajectory on a silver medal of the 2019 International Physics Olympiad

In October 2015, SpaceIL signed a contract for a launch from Cape Canaveral in Florida on a SpaceX Falcon 9 booster, via Spaceflight Industries. It was launched on 22 February 2019 at 01:45 UTC (20:45 local time on 21 February 2019) as a secondary payload, along with the telecom satellite PSN-6. Beresheet was controlled by a command center in Yehud, Israel.

From 24 February to 19 March 2019, the main engine was used four times to raise the orbit, putting its apogee close to the Moon's orbital distance. The spacecraft performed maneuvers so as to be successfully captured into an elliptical lunar orbit on 4 April 2019, and adjusted its flight pattern in a circular orbit around the Moon. Once it was in the correct circular orbit, it was planned to decelerate for a soft landing on the lunar surface. This was planned for 11 April 2019.

== Planned landing site ==
The planned landing site was in the north part of the Mare Serenitatis, and the landing zone was about 15 km (9.3 mi) in diameter.

== Planned operations ==
Beresheet was planned to operate for an estimated two days on the lunar surface, as it had no thermal control and was expected to quickly overheat. Its main mission would have been to gather imagery and send it back to Earth. Additionally, the craft would have made magnetic measurements. It was also planned to reignite its main engine and perform a "hop" to another place in the Moon's surface, demonstrating relocation capability in its Moon exploration. The retroreflector was a passive device requiring no electrical power and was expected to be functional for several decades.

=== NASA contribution ===
In addition to contributing the laser retroreflector to the mission, NASA planned to contribute space communications capabilities during the cruise phase and operations phase, even giving Beresheet time on the Deep Space Network. NASA also planned to survey Beresheet with its Lunar Reconnaissance Orbiter (which it did after the crash-landing). In exchange, SpaceIL would have shared its magnetic measurements with NASA.

== Crash landing ==
Crash site of Beresheet as seen by the Lunar Reconnaissance Orbiter

On 11 April 2019, the lander crash-landed on the lunar surface. An Inertial Measurement Unit (IMU2) gyroscope failed during the braking procedure on approach to the landing site, and the ground control crew was unable to reset the individual component due to a sudden loss of communications with the control network. By the time communications were restored, the craft's main engine had already been inactive for an extended period. The engine was brought back online following a system-wide reset; however, the craft had already lost too much altitude to slow its descent sufficiently. The final telemetry reading indicated that at an altitude of 150 m (490 ft) the craft was still traveling at over 500 km/h (310 mph; 140 m/s), resulting in a total loss on impact with the lunar surface. Prior to impact, the probe had been able to take two last photographs: a view of itself against the Moon, and a closer shot of the Moon's surface.

The lander's final resting position is 32.5956°N 19.3496°E, portrayed in the following LROC images:

- M1236487095L (before impact)
- M1098722768L (before impact – 2012-08-04 – 12:31:41, line 24245, sample 4031)
- M1101080642R (before impact – 2012-08-31 – 19:29:35, line 14398, sample 1424)
- M1310536929R (after impact)

=== Post-mission failure investigation ===
Several malfunctions plus human-in-the-loop decisions led to the crash landing during the final lunar descent. These were the result of limited funding; poor systems engineering design with a lack of redundancy in some systems and an inability of telemetry-software updates to remain active following system reboot; as well as human decisions about which path to take after the failure of one of the two redundant accelerometers (inertial measurement units, or IMUs) during the final lunar descent. A decision was made by the control team—which could have continued the descent with a single IMU, or tried to reinitiate the IMU which had shut down—to restart the second IMU.

Due to the design of the spacecraft, restarting the IMU blocks communication with the functioning IMU. For less than one critical second, the spacecraft did not receive any acceleration data from the good IMU, and as programmed, identified it as a navigation malfunction, which caused a reboot of the spacecraft computer. The reboot lasted only approximately two seconds, but since the spacecraft design did not allow for previous software updates to be loaded automatically from the hard drive on reboot, the software patches had to be uploaded once again as a command file. Five tries were needed to get the updates to load, with the computer rebooting each time, and the main engine shut down during the reboots. Since the engine was needed to be continuously firing during the descent to decelerate Beresheet, the spacecraft retained excessive speed and struck the lunar surface at over 500 km/h (310 mph; 140 m/s).

== Wreckage ==
NASA's Lunar Reconnaissance Orbiter (LRO) overflew the area where Beresheet's telemetry ended, and took photos of the surface. When those photos were compared against earlier photos of the same location, one set of new features was obvious. A faint lighter line leads to a lighter halo surrounding a dark crater. A lump is visible at the head of the crater opposite the line. The light halo may either be gas associated with the craft's wreckage or fine soil particles blown outward by the impact. A small NASA payload known as the Lunar Retroflector Array (LRA) is hoped to have survived the crash. Though it may have separated from the main wreckage, the Lunar Orbiter Laser Altimeter (LOLA) instrument on the LRO is pulsing laser images at the crash site in hopes of finding the LRA.

In August 2019, scientists reported that a capsule containing tardigrade micro-animals in their natural cryptobiotic state may have survived the crash and lived on the Moon for a while. On previous space missions, tardigrades were exposed to the open vacuum of space and some were able to live for a period of time. There is no real danger they will spread across the Moon, but this "tardigrade affair" attracted the criticism of professionals who pointed out the lack of both planetary protection measures and international regulation to enforce such measures. In May 2021, a team of researchers led by Alejandra Traspas, a student at Queen Mary University of London, claimed that the tardigrades were most likely destroyed by the force of the crash.

== Beresheet 2 ==
Originally Beresheet was planned to be a one-time-only mission. However, on 13 April 2019, Morris Kahn announced that a new mission, named Beresheet 2, would attempt a second time to land on the Moon. On 25 November 2019, it was announced that Beresheet 2 would attempt to send one lander to the Moon and another to Mars.

On 9 December 2020, SpaceIL announced that the Beresheet 2 Moon mission would launch in 2024 (later planned to 2025), and would consist of an orbiter and two landers. It would have a budget of US$100 million, similar to that of Beresheet 1, and would include more international collaboration, with the United Arab Emirates as one of seven countries expressing interest. As of 2025, the mission was suspended due to lack of funding.

== Minor planet ==
The minor planet 27050 Beresheet is named after the spacecraft.

== Intellectual property ==
IAI owns the intellectual property of the Beresheet design. On 9 June 2019, it was announced that IAI signed an agreement with the American company Firefly Aerospace to build a lunar lander based on Beresheet. Firefly Aerospace is one of several "main contractors" for NASA's Commercial Lunar Payload Services (CLPS), and they planned to propose a lunar lander based on Beresheet called Genesis. Genesis would be launched on another vehicle Firefly planned to build, a rocket called Beta, or a Falcon 9 launch vehicle in late 2022. Due to changing CLPS specifications, Firefly determined that Genesis no longer fit NASA's requirements and started work on a new lunar lander design called Blue Ghost in 2021. Despite being developed by Firefly, IAI will support the Blue Ghost lunar lander development effort as per their previous agreement on Genesis.

On 4 February 2021, NASA awarded a CLPS contract worth approximately US$93.3 million to Firefly Aerospace to deliver a suite of ten science investigations and technology demonstrations to the Moon in 2023.

== See also ==
- Commercial use of space
- List of artificial objects on the Moon
- List of missions to the Moon
- List of software bugs § Space
