= Benjamin Kahn =

Israeli biologist

- Born: 1954 (age 71–72); South Africa
- Occupation: Marine biologist
- Parent: Morris Kahn

Benjamin Kahn (born 1954) is a marine biologist and environmental activist.

His work includes ecological improvements of the Red Sea reef, where damage began in 1997 with the advent of fish farming, resulting from tons of waste into the reef. Kahn appeared on Time magazine's list of "Heroes of the Environment" October 2007. Kahn's work has been done largely through Zalul Environmental Association, an environmental non-profit organization founded by his billionaire father and dedicated to protecting the seas and rivers in Israel. Kahn serves as chairman of Zalul.

Kahn is the founder and CEO of Atlantium Technologies, a water purification technology firm established in 2005 that developed a hydro-optic ultraviolet technology used as a non-chemical means to control biofouling. In 2017, Atlantium was chosen to install this system to prevent the clogging of piping at the Hoover Dam by quagga mussels.

Kahn is the president of Coral World International Ltd, an operator of marine parks that specializes in ecologically-friendly tropical life systems in symbiotic environments.
