= Nusantara Satu =

Indonesian communications satellite

- Names: PSN VI; PSN-6
- Mission type: Communications satellite
- Operator: PT Pasifik Satelit Nusantara (PSN)
- COSPAR ID: 2019-009A
- SATCAT no.: 44048
- Website: https://www.psn.co.id/nsatu/
- Mission duration: 15 years (planned)

Spacecraft properties
- Bus: SSL 1300
- Manufacturer: Space Systems Loral (SSL)
- Launch mass: 4100 kg

Start of mission
- Launch date: 22 February 2019, 01:45:00 UTC
- Rocket: Falcon 9 Block 5 B1048-3
- Launch site: Cape Canaveral, SLC-40
- Contractor: SpaceX

Orbital parameters
- Reference system: Geocentric orbit
- Regime: Geostationary orbit
- Longitude: 148° East

Transponders
- Band: 38 C-band and 8 Ku-band
- Bandwidth: 15 Gbits per second
- Capacity: High-throughput satellite
- Coverage area: Indonesia, Southeast Asia

Nusantara Satu (Nusantara 1, formerly known as PSN VI or PSN-6) is an Indonesian communications satellite. It is a large high-throughput satellite (HTS) providing voice and data communications, and Internet access throughout the Indonesian archipelago and Southeast Asia.

Nusantara Satu was built by Space Systems Loral (SSL) and was launched on 22 February 2019 on a Falcon 9 Block 5 launch vehicle along with the satellite Beresheet (2019-009B) Moon lander by SpaceIL and Israel Aerospace Industries (IAI) and the microsat S5 (2019-009D) by the U.S. Air Force Research Laboratory (AFRL).

== Overview ==
Nusantara Satu is a communications satellite developed and designed by SSL for PT Pasifik Satelit Nusantara (PSN), the first private company in the telecommunications and information services sector in Indonesia. The project's cost is US$230 million.

The massive satellite features solar-electric ion thrusters but also employs conventional chemical propellant for stationkeeping while in orbit.

== Service ==
The Nusantara Satu satellite carries 26 C-band, 12 extended C-band transponders and 8 Ku-band transponders. The satellite offers a total bandwidth of 15 gigabits per second. Its expected service time is a minimum of 15 years. It will provide communications links to rural parts of Indonesia, allowing PSN to expand broadband internet services into these regions.
