= Prepaid telephone call =

Prepaid telephone calls are a popular way of making telephone calls which allow the caller to control spending without making a commitment with the telephone company.

Prepaid phone cards are provided by various telecom companies. When you purchase a prepaid phone card, you are paying for long distance connection time in advance. When you make calls using the phone card, the card's value is deducted based on connection fee, duration of connection, surcharges and any maintenance charges associated with the phone card.

Prepaid telephone calls are usually implemented in the company's network using the intelligent network functionality. The competitive prices these operators offer are usually made possible by least cost routing and lower overheads than the larger telephone operators.

== Types of prepaid calling ==
- Telephone prepaid calling cards (commonly known as Phone Cards in the US and the UK) are available from newsstands and drugstores. They are often the cheapest means of making long-distance or even international telephone calls. Moreover, they offer complete anonymity. Phone cards sold by retailers are live (active) when purchased by consumers.
- Web sites offer prepaid Personal identification numbers (PINs) for calling; thus there is no physical phone card. Prepaid online calling cards are more convenient to use, because most of the companies provide the option of registering the phone and avoiding using PINs at all. Rates vary from provider to provider, but the customer should be aware that cards with cheaper rates usually have hidden maintenance and/or connection fees.
- Prepaid calling operators offer services to customers who hold accounts with them and have paid money in advance. The service is typically accessed by the user dialling a toll free number from any telephone (PSTN, call box, mobile phone etc.). The user then authenticates himself with the operator by entering a PIN, types in the digits of the number to connect to, and then is connected by the operator. Often these operators have toll free numbers all over the world, so a customer can access the service even when he is abroad.
- Prepaid mobile phones are offered by most mobile phone operators around the world. Typically all the usual mobile phone services are available to prepaid users, except that they have to top up their balance in advance before they can be used. This is done via a variety of mechanisms - vouchers (commonly called "power cards"), swipe cards, debit and credit cards. An IVR is usually provided to allow the user to find out his current balance by dialling a short code. After the balance has been topped up, a user may make calls, send text messages and listen to voicemail in the usual way. For mobile prepaid typically use INAP or CAP protocol.

== See also ==
- Prepayment for service (general concept of paying in advance)
