= SpaceIL =

Israeli organization working on landing a spacecraft on the moon

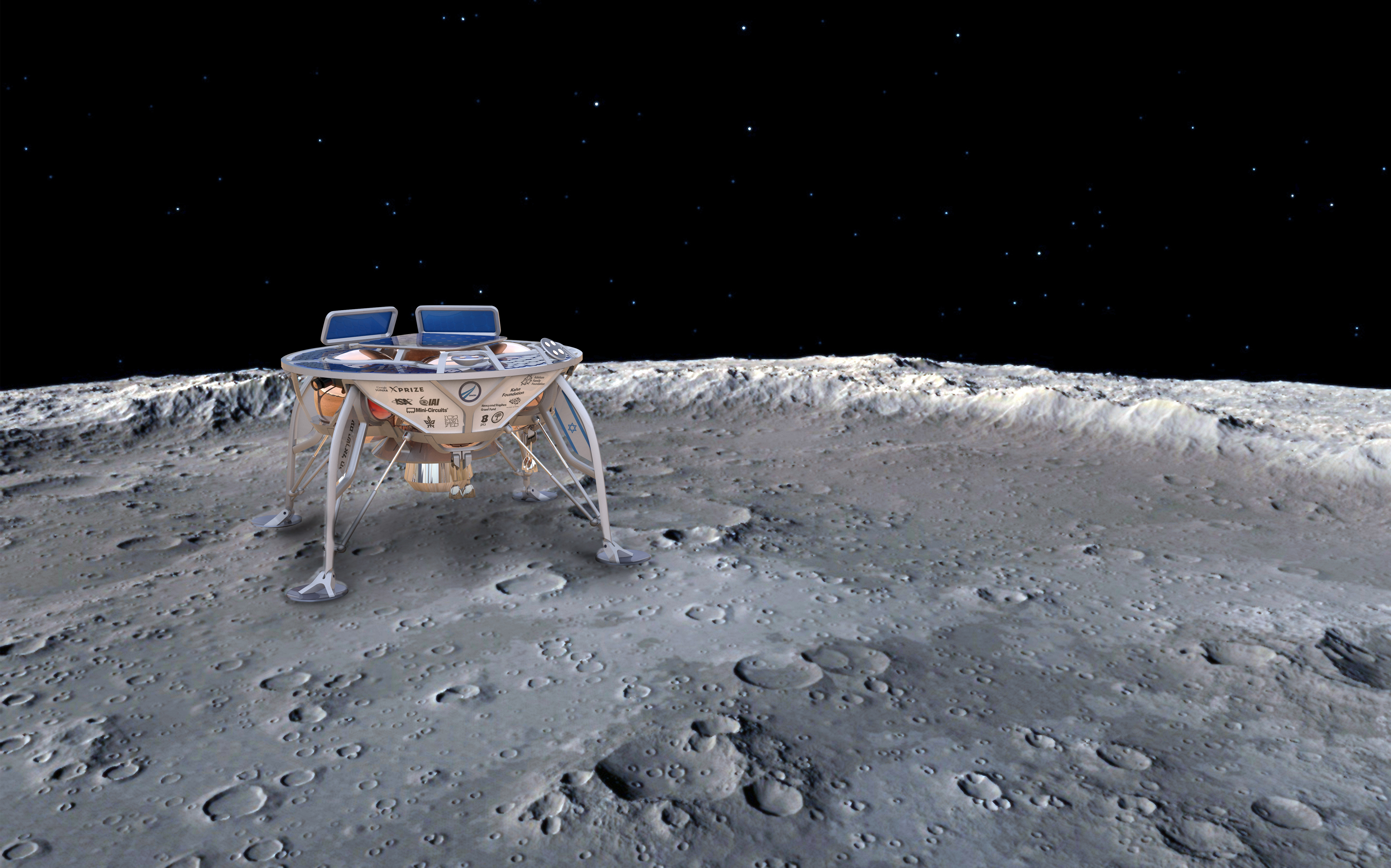
- Illustration of Beresheet Spacecraft on the Moon
- Formation: 2011; 15 years ago
- Founders: Yariv Bash, Kfir Damari, Yonatan Winetraub
- Founded at: Israel
- Type: Non-profit
- Legal status: Active
- Purpose: Promote STEM through deep space missions
- Headquarters: Israel
- Location: Kiryat Ono
- Products: Educational programs
- Fields: Space and Education
- Staff: 10 (2026)
- Website: eng.spaceil.com

SpaceIL is an Israeli private non profit association, established in 2011, that competed in the Google Lunar X Prize (GLXP) contest to land a spacecraft on the Moon by private organization.

SpaceIL successfully launched its Beresheet lander on 22 February 2019 at 01:45 UTC; it entered lunar orbit on 4 April 2019 at 14:18 UTC. On 11 April 2019, during the landing procedure, a problem occurred in the final stage of the landing process. Consequently, communications were lost with the spacecraft, long enough for the speed braking process to fail, and the vehicle crashed on the lunar surface. The Beresheet mission had included plans to measure the Moon's magnetic field at the landing site, and was carrying a laser retroreflector, and a "time capsule" containing analog and digital information, created by the Arch Mission Foundation. Beresheet was the first Israeli spacecraft to travel beyond Earth's orbit and was the first privately funded landing on the Moon. Though the spacecraft crashed, Israel became the seventh country to make lunar orbit and the fourth country, after the Soviet Union, the United States, and China to attempt a soft landing on the Moon.

Two days after the failed attempt to soft land on the Moon, SpaceIL announced plans for a second attempt, Beresheet 2. This mission has been suspended in 2025 due to lack of funding.

The SpaceIL team was founded as a nonprofit organization wishing to promote scientific and technological education in Israel. Its total budget for the mission was estimated at US$100 million, mostly donated by Israeli billionaire Morris Kahn, Sheldon Edelson and other philanthropists, as well as the Israel Space Agency (ISA).

== History ==
SpaceIL began as a competitor for the Google Lunar X Prize (GLXP), which offered US$30 million in prizes to inspire teams to develop low-cost methods of robotic lunar exploration. The SpaceIL entry was unique among GLXP contenders, in that instead of building a tracked or wheeled rover, SpaceIL planned to meet the requirement to travel 500 meters (1,600 ft) on the lunar surface by having the lander "hop" using rocket engine propulsion from its landing site to another site more than 500 meters away.

By June 2017, the lander spacecraft was undergoing integration and testing, and in August 2017, Google Lunar XPrize announced an extension of the prize competition deadline to 31 March 2018, but the contest ended without a winner when no team launched before the deadline. Nevertheless, SpaceIL continued development and fabrication.

By January 2019, testing was complete and the spacecraft was delivered to Cape Canaveral, Florida for launch on a SpaceX Falcon 9 rocket. The mission was successfully launched on 22 February 2019.

The CEO of SpaceIL was Ido Anteby, and the president remains Morris Kahn.

On 11 April 2019, its main engine malfunctioned during descent, and the lander crashed on the Moon's surface. Though the mission failed, Israel was the seventh country to have a spacecraft orbit the Moon.

=== Founders and supporters ===
The cofounders of the team were Yariv Bash, former electronics and computer engineer in the Interdisciplinary Center in Herzliya, and Flytrex CEO; Kfir Damari, a Computer Networking lecturer and entrepreneur; and Yonatan Winetraub, formerly a satellite systems engineer at Israel Aerospace Industries and a biophysics PhD candidate at Stanford University. Morris Kahn was the chairman of the public board. The CEO of SpaceIL was Ido Anteby since 2018.

The team has technical support from the Israel Space Agency (ISA), Israel Aerospace Industries, Rafael Systems and Elbit Systems. SpaceIL was also supported by educational institutions, including the Technion, Tel Aviv University, Weizmann Institute of Science and Ben-Gurion University of the Negev. . The founders of the team stated that if they had won the competition, the money would have been donated to educational purposes.

After building the Beresheet lunar lander, its prime contractor Israel Aerospace Industries was contemplating the possibility of building commercial landers.

== Beresheet ==
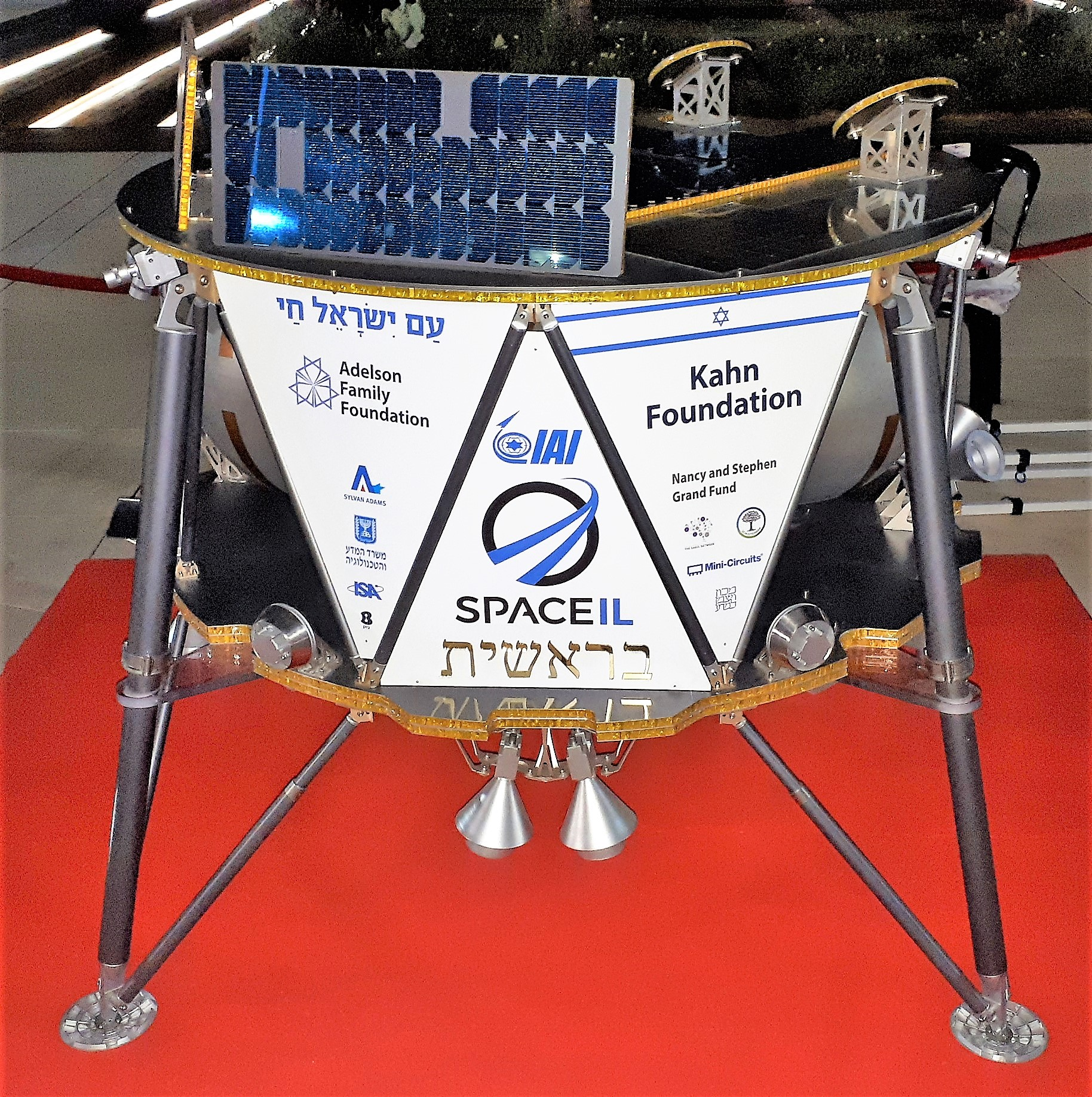
Full size model of the Beresheet Moon lander

Beresheet was a demonstrator of a small robotic lunar lander. Its aims included promoting careers in science, technology, engineering, and mathematics (STEM); and landing its magnetometer and laser retroreflector on the Moon.

The lander was previously known as Sparrow, and was officially named Beresheet (Hebrew: בְּרֵאשִׁית, "Genesis") in December 2018. Its net mass was 150 kg (330 lb); when fueled at launch its mass was 585 kg (1,290 lb). Size-wise, it had been compared to a washing machine. It used seven ground stations, globally, for Earth-lander communication. Its Mission Control room is at Israel Aerospace Industries in Yehud, Israel.

=== Payload ===
The spacecraft carried a "time capsule" created by the Arch Mission Foundation, containing over 30 million pages of analog and digital data, including a full copy of the English-language Wikipedia, the Wearable Rosetta disc, the PanLex database, the Torah, children's drawings, a children's book inspired by the space launch, memoirs of a Holocaust survivor, Israel's national anthem (Hatikvah), the Israeli flag, and a copy of the Israeli Declaration of Independence.

Its scientific payload included a magnetometer supplied by the Israeli Weizmann Institute of Science to measure the local magnetic field, and a laser retroreflector array supplied by NASA's Goddard Space Flight Center to enable precise measurements of the Earth–Moon distance.

=== Propulsion ===
The spacecraft featured one main LEROS 2b and 8 DST-12 small liquid-propellant, restartable rocket engine, using monomethylhydrazine (MMH) fuel and mixed oxides of nitrogen (MON) as oxidizer. This single engine was used to reach lunar orbit, as well as for deceleration and propulsive landing.The DST12 engines were mainly used for flight control maneuvers

=== Launch ===
In October 2015, SpaceIL signed a contract for a launch from Cape Canaveral in Florida on a SpaceX Falcon 9 booster, via Spaceflight Industries. It was launched on 22 February 2019 at 0145 UTC (20:45 local time on 21 February) as a secondary payload, along with the telecom satellite Nusantara Satu (formally PSN-6). Beresheet was being controlled by a command center in Yehud, Israel.

From 24 February to 19 March, the main engine was used four times for orbit raising, putting its apogee close to the Moon's orbital distance. The spacecraft performed maneuvers so as to be successfully captured into an elliptical lunar orbit on 4 April 2019, and then adjusted its flight pattern into a circular orbit around the Moon. Once in the correct circular orbit, it was intended for the craft to decelerate for a soft landing on the lunar surface on 11 April 2019.

=== Landing plan ===
The planned landing site was at the northern region of Mare Serenitatis, with a landing zone about 15 km (9.3 mi) in diameter.

Beresheet was to operate for an estimated two Earth days on the lunar surface, as it had no robust thermal control and was expected to overheat. However, its laser retroreflector was a passive device requiring no electrical power and was expected to be functional for several decades.

=== Failed landing ===
On 11 April 2019, at approximately 1900 UTC, the lander began its de-orbit and landing procedure. Within minutes before the expected landing, mission control received a "selfie" photograph from the probe with the lunar surface visible in the background. During the braking procedure on approach to the landing site, the craft's main engine stopped operating. The engine was brought back online following a system reset; however, the craft had already lost too much altitude to slow its descent speed sufficiently. The spacecraft arrived at the surface of the Moon, but at a speed and angle that did not allow for a soft landing. Having apparently crashed, communication with the lander ended. SpaceIL announced the failure at 19:25 UTC. Final telemetry values on the mission control screens showed an altitude of 149 m (489 ft), and horizontal and vertical velocities of 946.7 m/s (2,118 mph) and −134 m/s (−300 mph), respectively.

=== Beresheet 2 ===
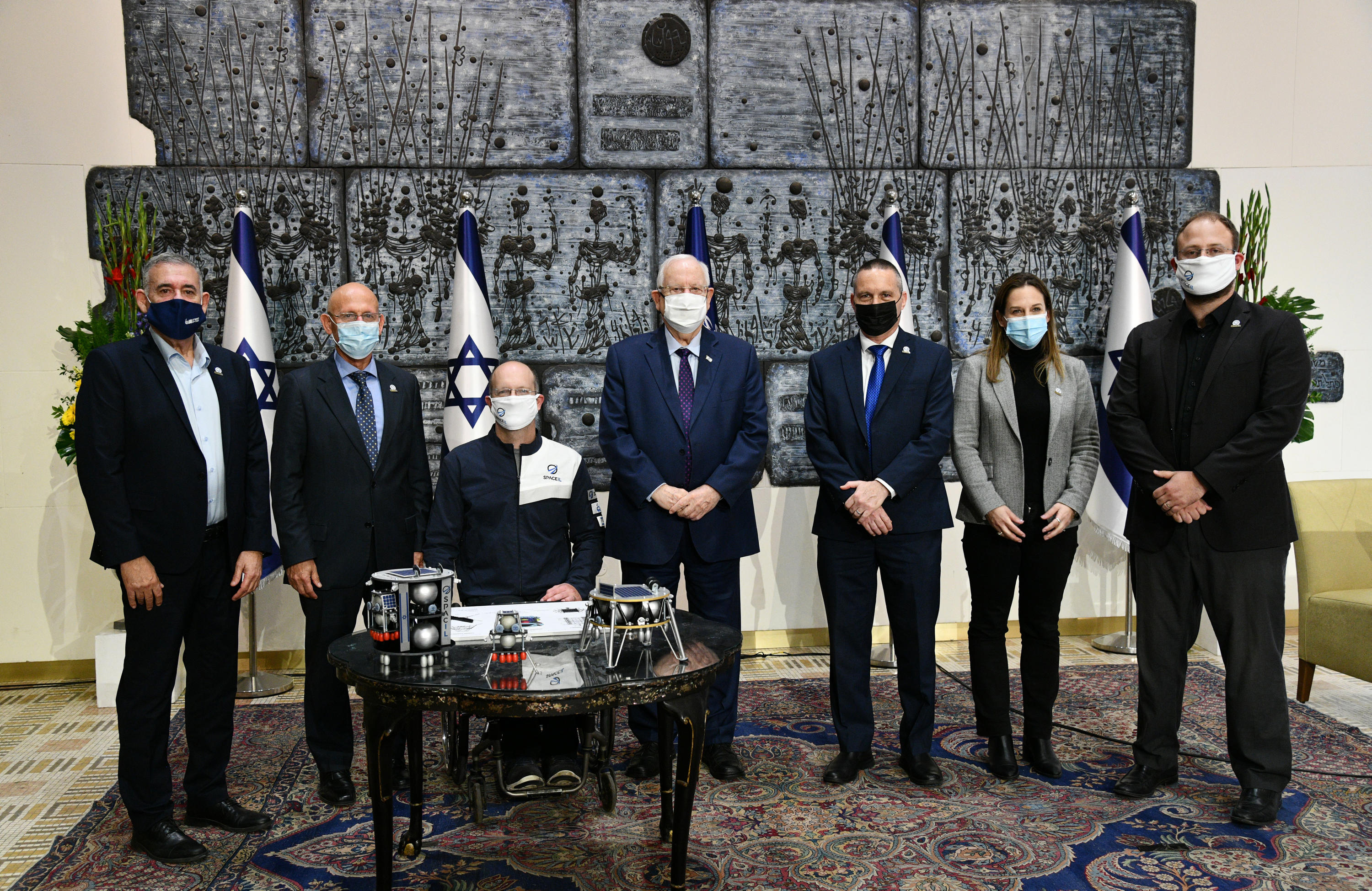
Reuven Rivlin hosting the launch event of the «Beresheet2» project,December 2020

On 13 April 2019, SpaceIL announced plans for a second attempt to the Moon, Beresheet 2, On 5 February 2020, Shimon Sarid was appointed CEO of SpaceIL to lead the Beresheet2 project with the goal of getting an uncrewed spacecraft to the Moon and soft-landing it. Following an extensive review of the Beresheet process, SpaceIL developed the Beresheet2 mission: a 3 spacecraft mission to the Moon comprising one orbiter and 2 landers. The two landers were supposed to land on both side of the Moon and conduct scientific experiences while the orbiter was planned to remain in lunar orbit up to 5 years for educational purposes.

The entire spacecraft configuration was expected to weigh approximately 1,100 kg, with each lander weighing about 160 kg.

The project was launched in 2020 with the generous support of philanthropists Morris Kahn, Patrick Drahi, Martin Moshal, and additional donors.

In April 2025, work on the project was put on hold after significant progress had already been made in the overall design of Beresheet 2. The suspension of the project was attributed to changes in donors’ priorities in light of the evolving national situation in Israel since 2023.

=== SpaceUP ===
Alongside its lunar missions, SpaceIL operates SpaceUP, an educational program designed to introduce middle and high school students to space engineering through the story and technology of the Beresheet mission.[1] Available in Hebrew, English, French, and Arabic, the program combines core concepts such as orbital mechanics, propulsion, and satellite systems with hands-on activities and research using real data collected by Beresheet’s onboard sensors.[1][2] SpaceUP is delivered in schools by trained educators and is part of SpaceIL’s mission statement to inspire the next generation and strengthen STEM education in Israel.^{[2]}
