= Kosmos 300 =

Failed Soviet lunar sample-return mission (1969)

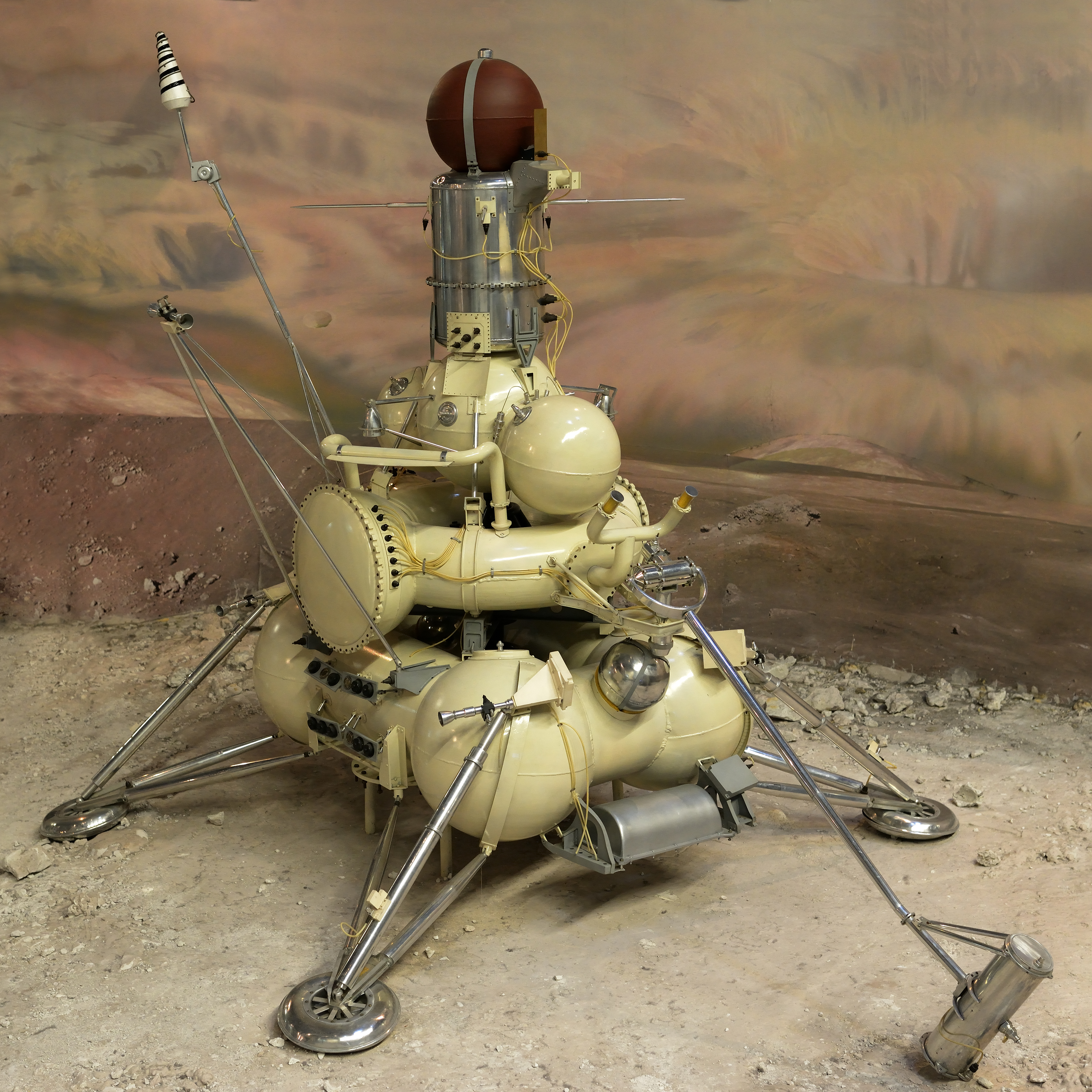
- A Ye-8-5 model in the Museum of Cosmonautics, Moscow.
- Mission type: Lunar sample-return
- Operator: Soviet space program
- COSPAR ID: 1969-080A
- SATCAT no.: 4104
- Mission duration: 4 days

Spacecraft properties
- Spacecraft type: Ye-8-5
- Manufacturer: GSMZ Lavochkin
- Launch mass: 5,600 kg (12,300 lb)

Start of mission
- Launch date: September 23, 1969, 14:07:00 UTC
- Rocket: Proton-K/D
- Launch site: Baikonur 81/24

End of mission
- Disposal: Launch failure
- Decay date: September 27, 1969

Orbital parameters
- Reference system: Geocentric
- Perigee altitude: 184 km (114 mi)
- Apogee altitude: 189 km (117 mi)
- Inclination: 51.5°
- Period: 88.2 min

Kosmos 300 (Russian: Космос 300 meaning Cosmos 300) (Ye-8-5 series) was the fourth Soviet attempt at an uncrewed lunar sample return. It was probably similar in design to the later Luna 16 spacecraft. It was launched, on a Proton rocket, on September 23, 1969. The mission was a failure. The engines on the Block D upper stage failed due to an oxidizer leak, leaving the spacecraft to burn up in Earth's atmosphere.
