= Kosmos 305 =

Failed Soviet lunar sample-return mission

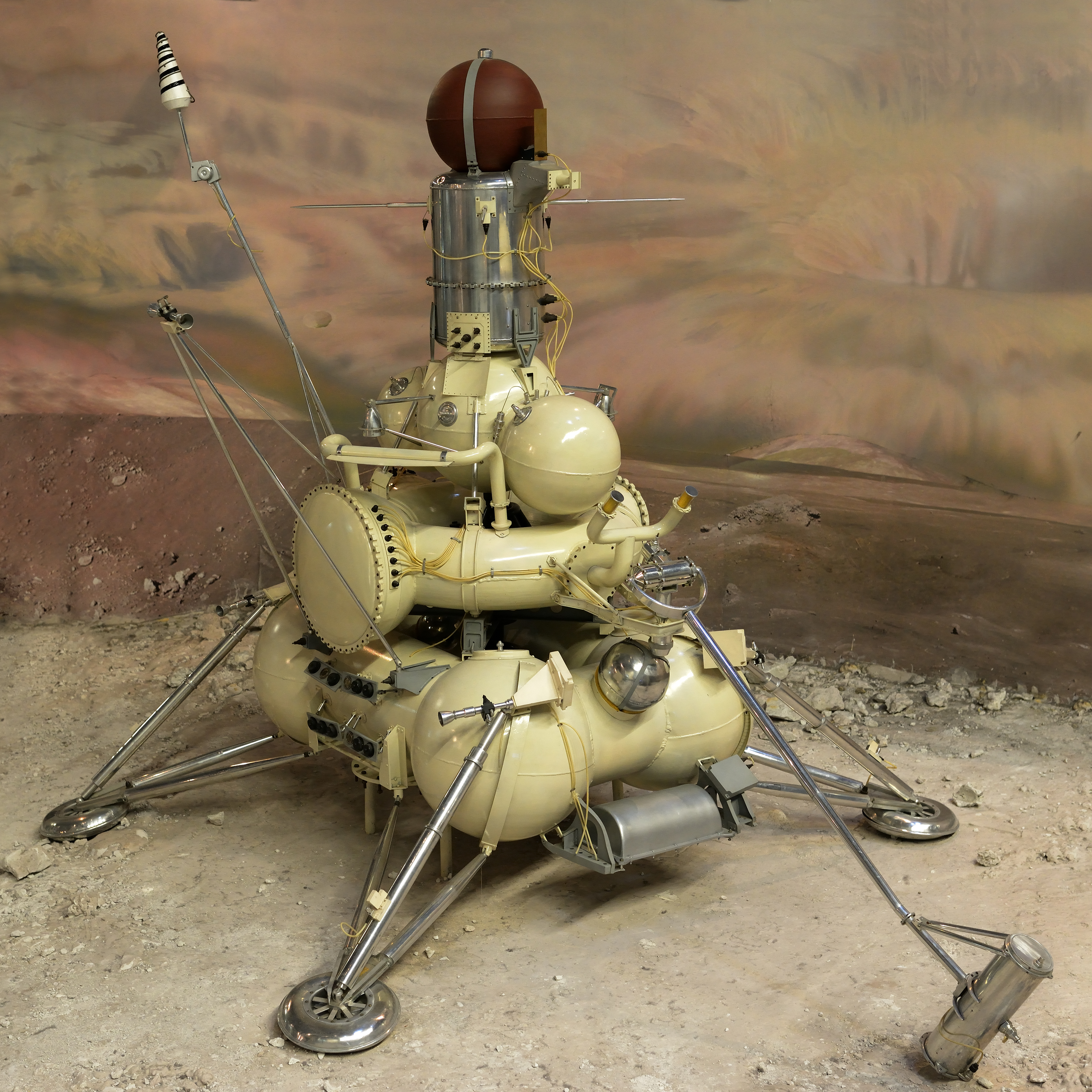
- A Ye-8-5 model in the Museum of Cosmonautics, Moscow.
- Operator: Soviet space program
- COSPAR ID: 1969-092A
- SATCAT no.: 4150
- Mission duration: 2 days

Spacecraft properties
- Spacecraft type: Ye-8-5
- Manufacturer: GSMZ Lavochkin
- Launch mass: 5,600 kg (12,300 lb)

Start of mission
- Launch date: October 22, 1969, 14:09:00 UTC
- Rocket: Proton-K/D
- Launch site: Baikonur 81/24

End of mission
- Disposal: Launch failure
- Decay date: October 24, 1969

Orbital parameters
- Reference system: Geocentric
- Perigee altitude: 182 km (113 mi)
- Apogee altitude: 208 km (129 mi)
- Inclination: 51.4°
- Period: 88.4 min

Kosmos 305 (Russian: Космос 305 meaning Cosmos 305) (Ye-8-5 series) was the fifth Soviet attempt at an uncrewed lunar sample return. It was probably similar in design to the Luna 16 spacecraft. It was launched, on a Proton rocket, on October 22, 1969. The engines on the Block D upper stage failed, terminating the mission. This left the spacecraft stranded in Earth orbit. It re-entered within two days.
