= Luna 20 =

1972 lunar sample retrieval mission as part of the USSR's Luna program

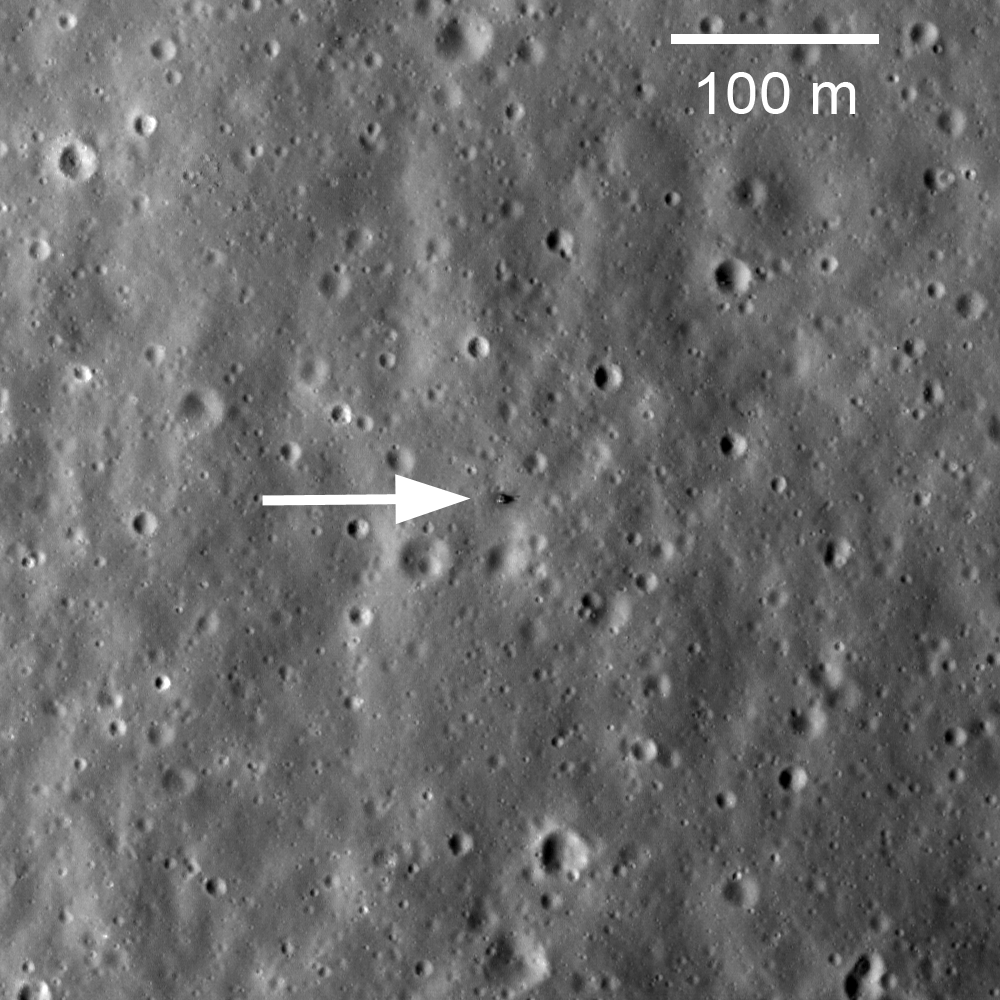
- Luna 20 as seen from orbit by the LRO in 2010
- Mission type: Lunar sample return
- Operator: Soviet space program
- COSPAR ID: 1972-007A
- SATCAT no.: 5835
- Mission duration: 11 days (day of launch to day of landing)

Spacecraft properties
- Bus: Ye-8-5
- Manufacturer: GSMZ Lavochkin
- Launch mass: 5,725 kilograms (12,621 lb)
- Dry mass: 5,600 kilograms (12,300 lb)

Start of mission
- Launch date: 14 February 1972, 03:27:58 UTC
- Rocket: Proton-K/D
- Launch site: Baikonur 81/24

End of mission
- Landing date: 25 February 1972, 19:19 UTC
- Landing site: 47°24′N 68°36′E, 40 km north of Dzhezkazgan, Kazakhstan

Orbital parameters
- Reference system: Selenocentric
- Semi-major axis: 6,477.8 kilometres (4,025.1 mi)
- Eccentricity: 0.0
- Periselene altitude: 100 kilometres (62 mi)
- Aposelene altitude: 100 kilometres (62 mi)
- Inclination: 65 degrees
- Period: 119 minutes

Lunar orbiter
- Orbits: ~36

Lunar lander
- Landing date: 21 February 1972, 19:19 UTC
- Return launch: 22 February 1972, 22:58 UTC
- Landing site: 3.7863°N 56.6242°E
- Sample mass: 30 grams

Luna 20 was the second of three successful Soviet lunar sample return missions. It was flown as part of the Luna program as a robotic competitor to the six successful Apollo lunar sample return missions.

Luna 20 was placed in an intermediate Earth parking orbit and from this orbit was sent towards the Moon. It entered lunar orbit on 18 February 1972. On 21 February 1972, Luna 20 soft landed on the Moon in a mountainous area known as the Terra Apollonius (or Apollonius highlands) near Mare Fecunditatis (Sea of Fertility), 120 km from where Luna 16 had landed.

While on the lunar surface, the panoramic television system was operated. Lunar samples were obtained by means of an extendable drilling apparatus. The ascent stage of Luna 20 was launched from the lunar surface on 22 February 1972 carrying 1.9 ounces (55 grams) of collected lunar samples in a sealed capsule. It landed in the Soviet Union on 25 February 1972. The lunar samples were recovered the following day.

== Overview ==
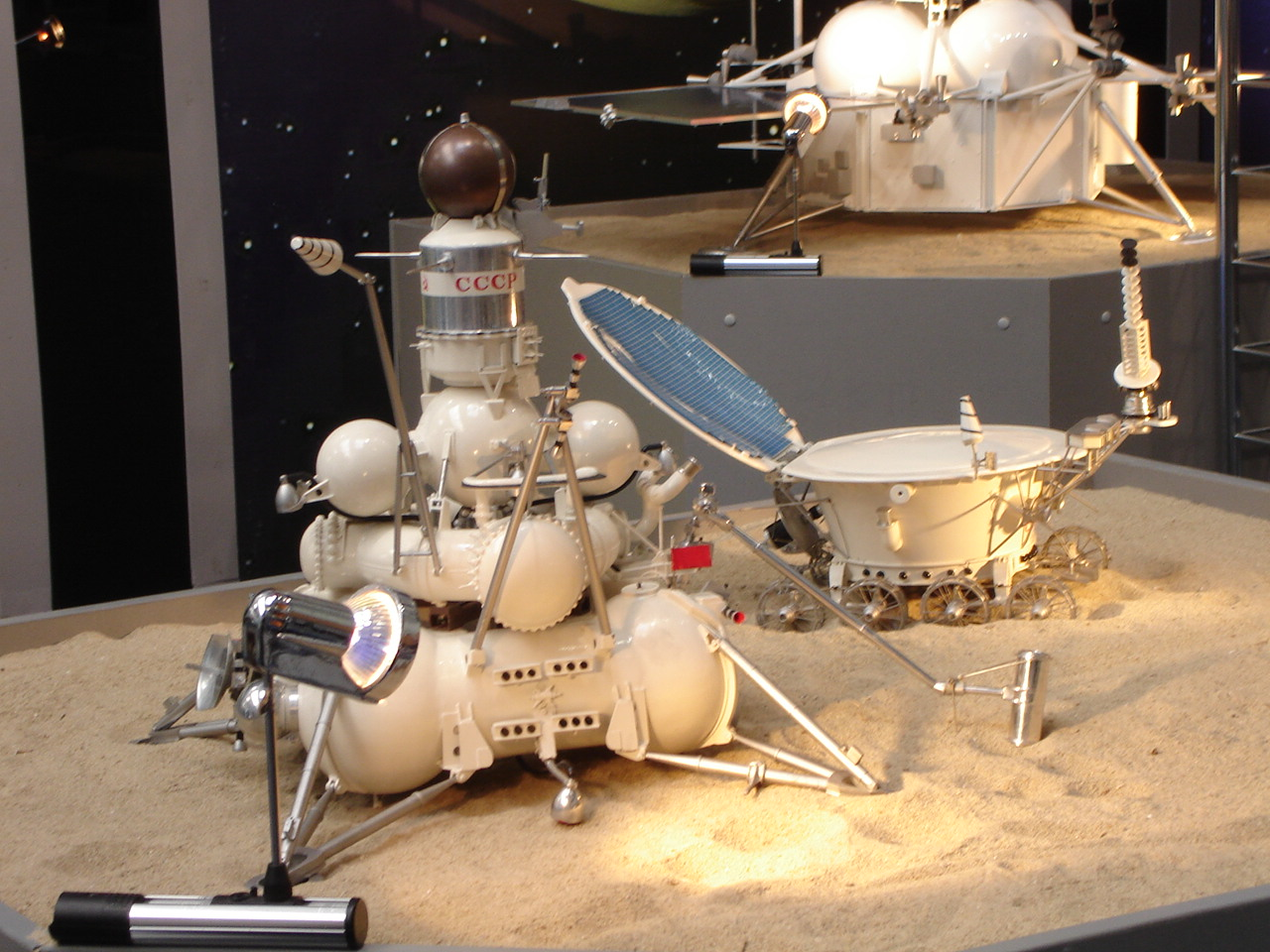
Model of the Luna sample return lander with soil sample scoop – the ascent stage is the smaller cylinder with spherical Earth-return capsule on top.

This was the eighth Soviet spacecraft launched with the intent of returning lunar soil to Earth. It was evidently sent to complete the mission that Luna 18 had failed to accomplish. After a 4.5-day flight to the Moon, which included a single midcourse correction on 15 February, Luna 20 entered orbit around the Moon on 18 February. Initial orbital parameters were 100 x 100 kilometers at 65° inclination.

Three days later, at 19:13 UT, the spacecraft fired its main engine for 267 seconds to begin descent to the lunar surface. A second firing further reduced velocity before Luna 20 set down safely on the Moon at 19:19 UT on 21 February 1972 at coordinates 3.7863 North and 56.6242 East, only 1.8 kilometers from the crash site of Luna 18.

After collecting a small sample of lunar soil, the spacecraft's ascent stage lifted off at 22:58 UT on 22 February and quickly accelerated to 2.7 kilometers per second velocity—sufficient to return to Earth. The small spherical capsule eventually parachuted down safely on an island in the Karkingir River, 40 kilometers north of the town of Jezkazgan in Kazakhstan, at 19:19 UT on 25 February 1972.

The 30-gram soil sample differed from that collected by Luna 16 in that the majority (50 to 60%) of the rock particles in the newer sample were ancient lunar highlands anorthosite (which consists largely of feldspar) rather than the basalt of the earlier one (which contained about 1 to 2% of anorthosite). The American Apollo 16 mission returned similar highlands material two months later.

Like the Luna 16 soil, samples of the Luna 20 collection were shared with American and French scientists. A 0.4983g sample of material from a depth of 27 and 32 cm was sent to Britain.

Lunar Mission	Sample Returned	Year
Luna 16	101 g	1970
Luna 20	30 g	1972
Luna 24	170.1 g	1976

In March 2010, NASA reported that its Lunar Reconnaissance Orbiter satellite had spotted Luna 20 on the lunar surface.

== See also ==
- Timeline of artificial satellites and space probes
- List of artificial objects on the Moon (descent stage)
- List of missions to the Moon
