= Sample-return mission =

Spacecraft mission

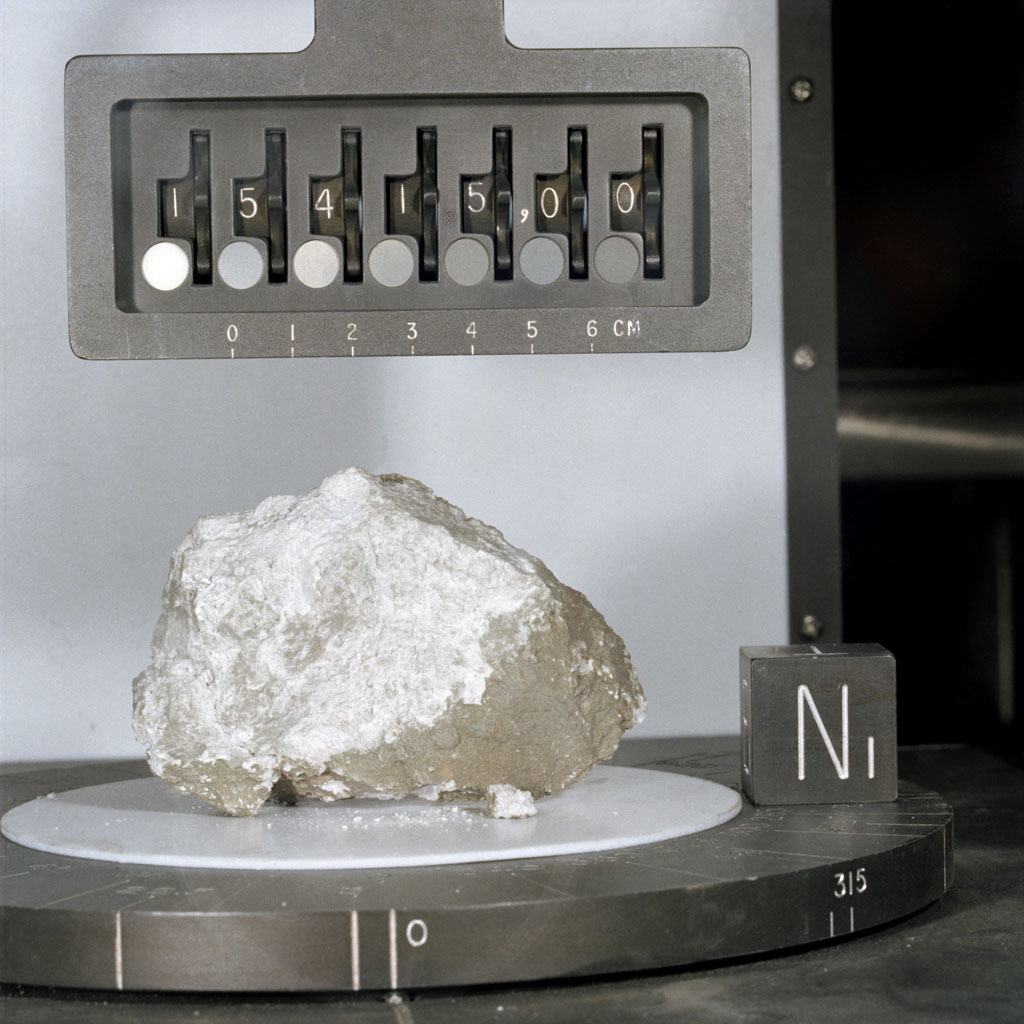
The Genesis Rock, returned by the Apollo 15 lunar mission in 1971.

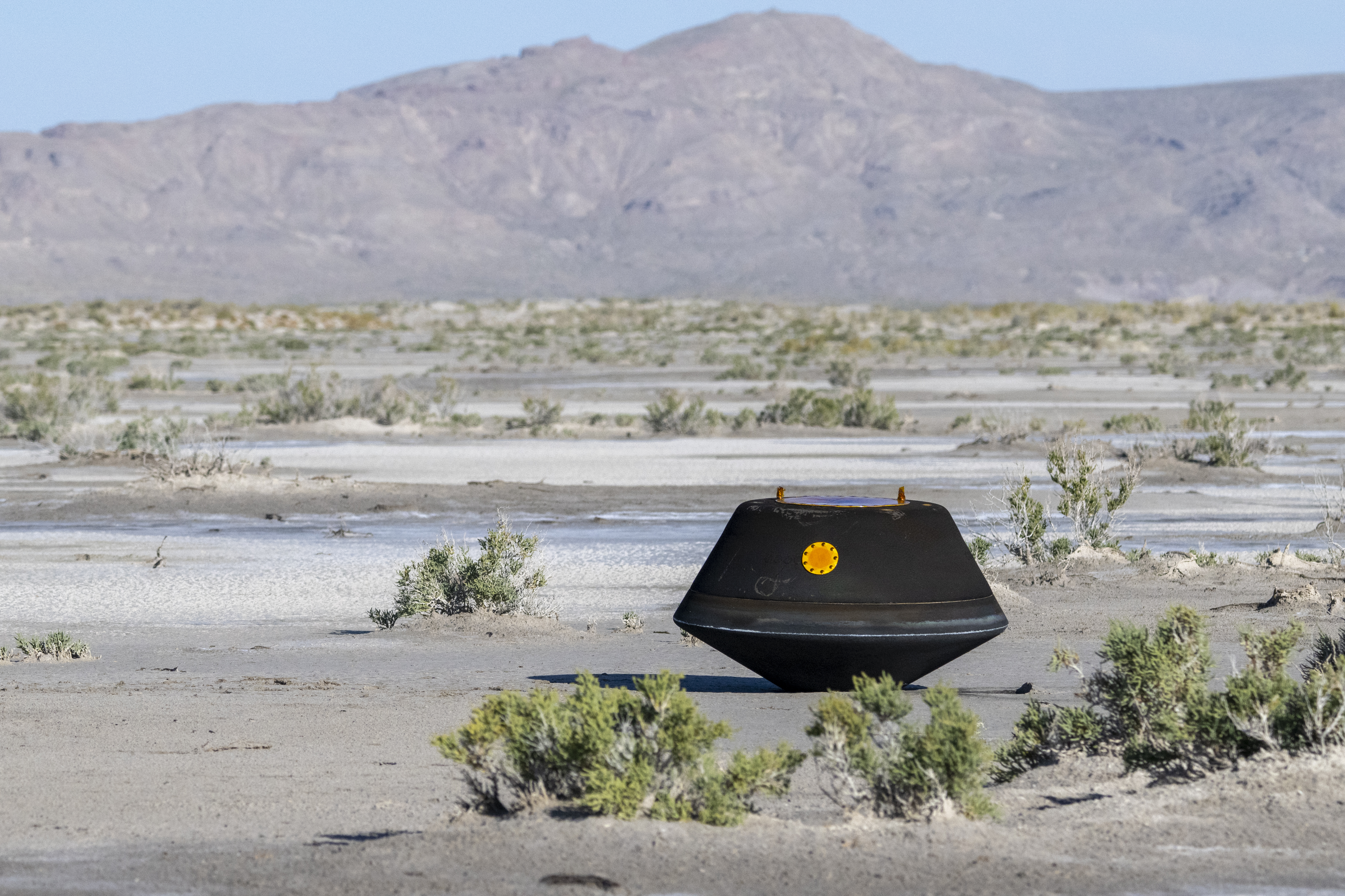
The sample return capsule from NASA’s OSIRIS-REx mission shortly after touching down in the desert in Utah

A sample-return mission is a spacecraft mission to collect and return samples from an extraterrestrial location to Earth for analysis. Sample-return missions may bring back merely atoms and molecules or a deposit of complex compounds such as loose material and rocks. These samples may be obtained in a number of ways, such as soil and rock excavation or a collector array used for capturing particles of solar wind or cometary debris. Nonetheless, concerns have been raised that the return of such samples to planet Earth may endanger Earth itself.

As of April 2026, samples of Moon rock from Earth's Moon have been collected by robotic and crewed missions; the comet Wild 2 and the asteroids 25143 Itokawa, 162173 Ryugu, and 101955 Bennu have been visited by robotic spacecraft which returned samples to Earth; and samples of the solar wind have been returned by the robotic Genesis mission.

In addition to sample-return missions, samples from three identified non-terrestrial bodies have been collected by other means: samples from the Moon in the form of Lunar meteorites, samples from Mars in the form of Martian meteorites, and samples from Vesta in the form of HED meteorites.

== Scientific use ==
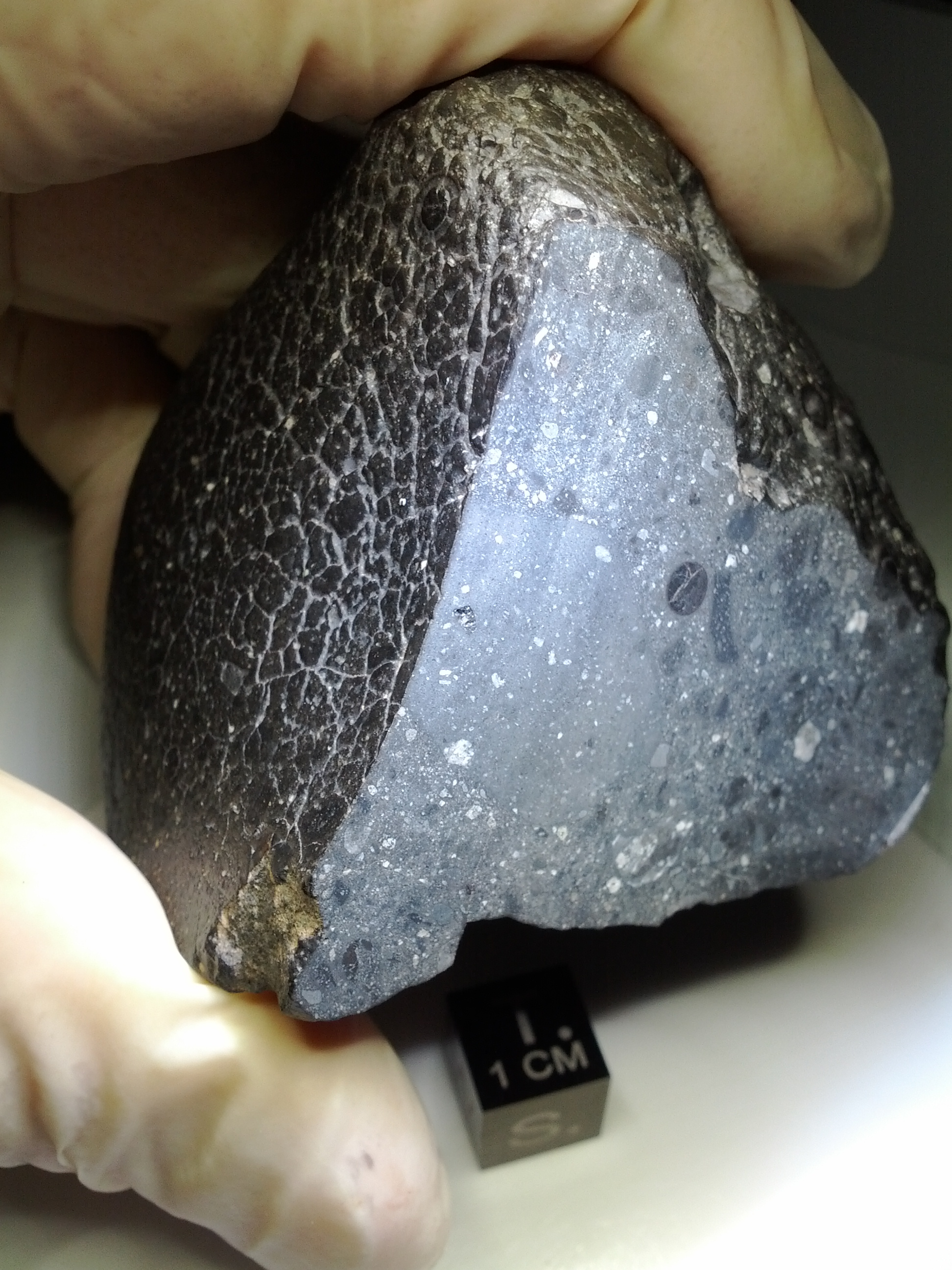
A meteorite thought to be from Mars

Samples available on Earth can be analyzed in laboratories to further understanding and knowledge as part of the discovery and exploration of the Solar System. Until now, many important scientific discoveries about the Solar System were made remotely with telescopes, and some Solar System bodies were visited by orbiting or even landing spacecraft with instruments capable of remote sensing or sample analysis. While such an investigation of the Solar System is technically easier than a sample-return mission, the scientific tools available on Earth to study such samples are far more advanced and diverse than those that can go on spacecraft. Further, analysis of samples on Earth allows follow up of any findings with different tools, including tools that can tell intrinsic extraterrestrial material from terrestrial contamination, and those that have yet to be developed; in contrast, a spacecraft can carry only a limited set of analytic tools, and these have to be chosen and built long before launch.

Samples analyzed on Earth can be matched against findings of remote sensing for more insight into the processes that formed the Solar System. This was done, for example, with findings by the Dawn spacecraft, which visited the asteroid Vesta from 2011 to 2012 for imaging, and samples from HED meteorites (collected on Earth until then), which were compared to data gathered by Dawn. These meteorites could then be identified as material ejected from the large impact crater Rheasilvia on Vesta. This allowed deducing the composition of the crust, mantle and core of Vesta. Similarly, some differences in the composition of asteroids (and, to a lesser extent, different compositions of comets) can be discerned by imaging alone. However, for a more precise inventory of the material on these different bodies, more samples will be collected and returned in the future, to match their compositions with the data gathered through telescopes and astronomical spectroscopy.

One further focus of such investigation—besides the basic composition and geologic history of the various Solar System bodies—is the presence of the building blocks of life on comets, asteroids, Mars or the moons of the gas giants. Several sample-return missions to asteroids and comets are currently in the works. More samples from asteroids and comets will help determine whether life formed in space and was carried to Earth by meteorites. Another question under investigation is whether extraterrestrial life formed on other Solar System bodies like Mars or on the moons of the gas giants, and whether life might even exist there. The result of NASA's last "Decadal Survey" was to prioritize a Mars sample-return mission, as Mars has a special importance: it is comparatively "nearby", might have harbored life in the past, and might even continue to sustain life. Jupiter's moon Europa is another important focus in the search for life in the Solar System. However, due to the distance and other constraints, Europa might not be the target of a sample-return mission in the foreseeable future.

== Planetary protection ==
Planetary protection aims to prevent biological contamination of both the target celestial body and the Earth in the case of sample-return missions. A sample return from Mars or other location with the potential to host life is a category V mission under COSPAR, which directs to the containment of any unsterilized sample returned to Earth. This is because it is unknown what the effects such hypothetical life would be on humans or the biosphere of Earth. For this reason, Carl Sagan and Joshua Lederberg argued in the 1970s that sample-return missions classified as category V should be performed with extreme caution, and later studies by the NRC and ESF agreed.

== Sample-return missions ==
=== First missions ===
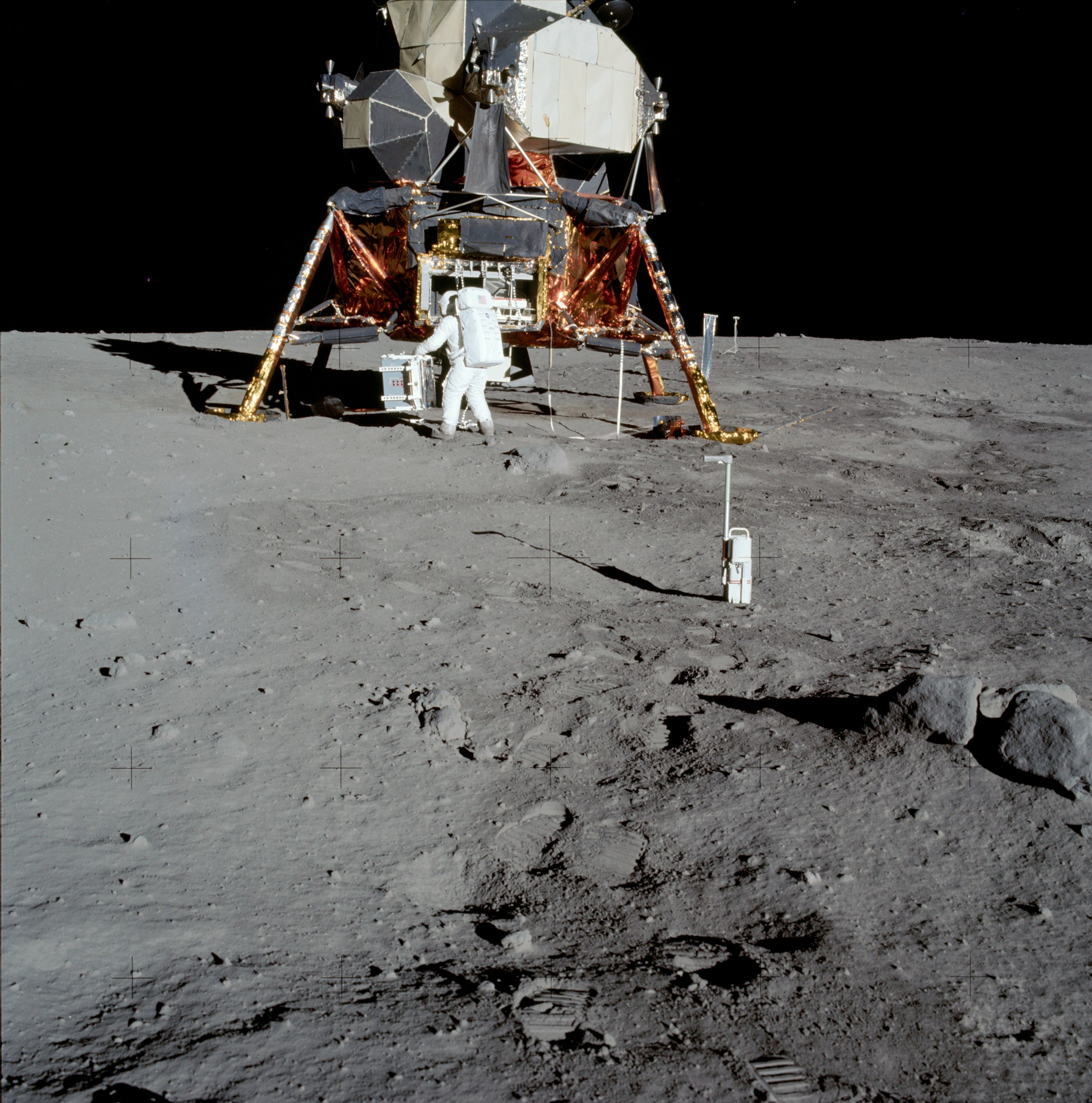
Apollo 11 was the first mission to return extraterrestrial samples.

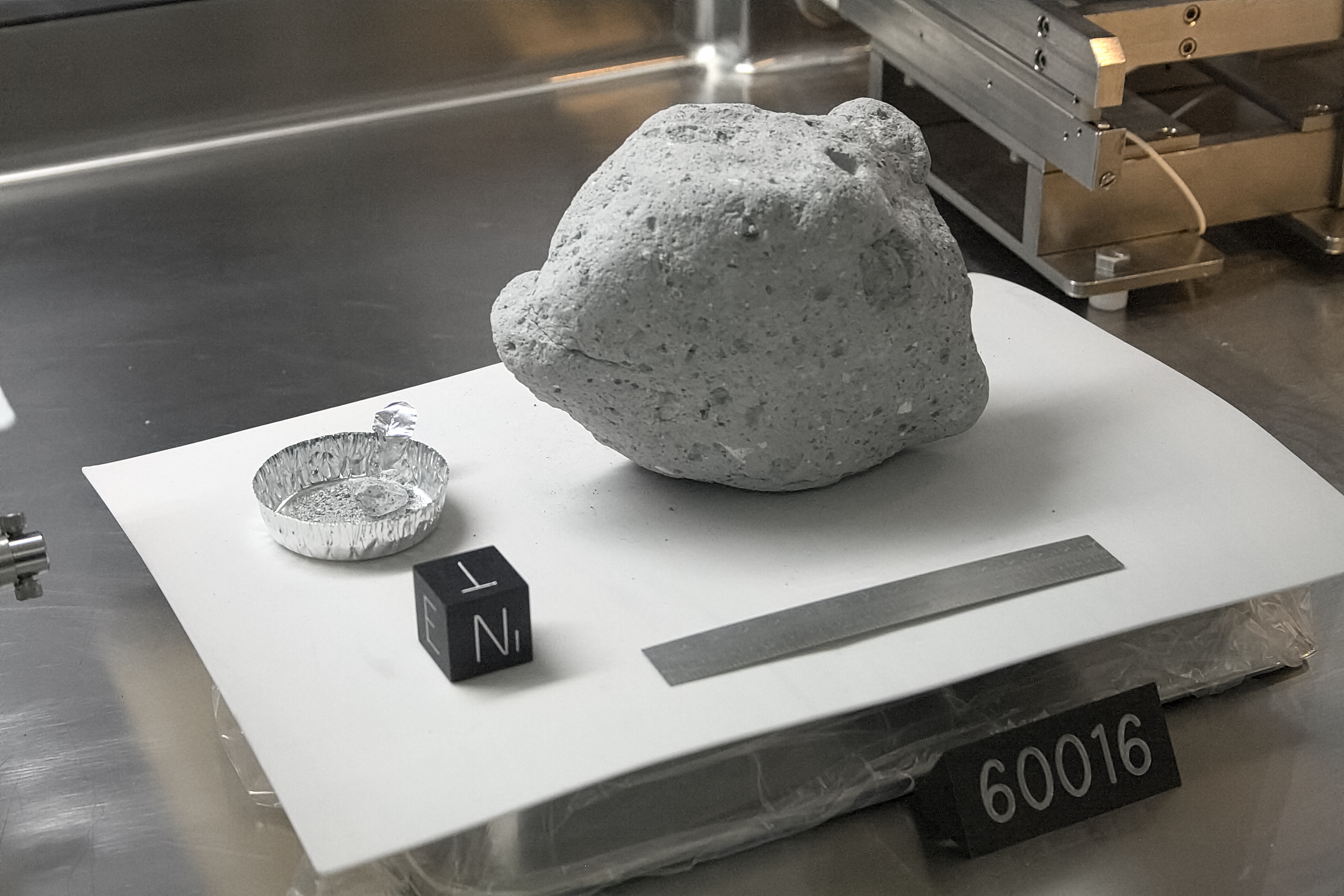
Lunar sample 60016 on display at Space Center Houston Lunar Samples Vault, at NASA's Johnson Space Center

In July 1969, Apollo 11 achieved the first successful sample return from another Solar System body when it returned 22 kilograms (49 lb) of Lunar surface material. This was followed by 34 kilograms (75 lb) of material and Surveyor 3 parts from Apollo 12, 42.8 kilograms (94 lb) of material from Apollo 14, 76.7 kilograms (169 lb) of material from Apollo 15, 94.3 kilograms (208 lb) of material from Apollo 16, and 110.4 kilograms (243 lb) of material from Apollo 17. The Apollo program as a whole returned over 382 kg (842 lb) of lunar rocks and regolith, including lunar soil, to the Lunar Receiving Laboratory in Houston. Today, 75% of the samples are stored at the Lunar Sample Laboratory Facility built in 1979.

In 1970, the robotic Soviet mission Luna 16 returned 101 grams (3.6 oz) of lunar soil, followed by Luna 20's return of 55 grams (1.9 oz) in 1974, and Luna 24's return of 170 grams (6.0 oz) in 1976. Although they recovered far less than the Apollo missions, they did this fully automatically. Apart from these three successes, other attempts under the Luna programme failed. The first two missions were intended to compete with Apollo 11 and were undertaken shortly before it in June and July 1969. Luna E-8-5 No. 402 failed at start, and Luna 15 crashed on the Moon. Later, other sample-return missions failed: Kosmos 300 and Kosmos 305 in 1969, Luna E-8-5 No. 405 in 1970, Luna E-8-5M No. 412 in 1975 had unsuccessful launches, and Luna 18 in 1971 and Luna 23 in 1974 had unsuccessful landings on the Moon.

In 1970, the Soviet Union planned for a 1975 first Mars sample-return mission in the Mars 5NM project. This mission was planned to use an N1 rocket, but this rocket never flew successfully and the mission evolved into the Mars 5M project, which would use a double launch with the smaller Proton rocket and an assembly at a Salyut space station. This Mars 5M mission was planned for 1979, but was canceled in 1977 due to technical problems and complexity.

=== 1990s ===
The Orbital Debris Collection (ODC) experiment deployed on the Mir space station for 18 months in 1996–97 used aerogel to capture particles from low Earth orbit, including both interplanetary dust and man-made particles.

=== 2000s ===
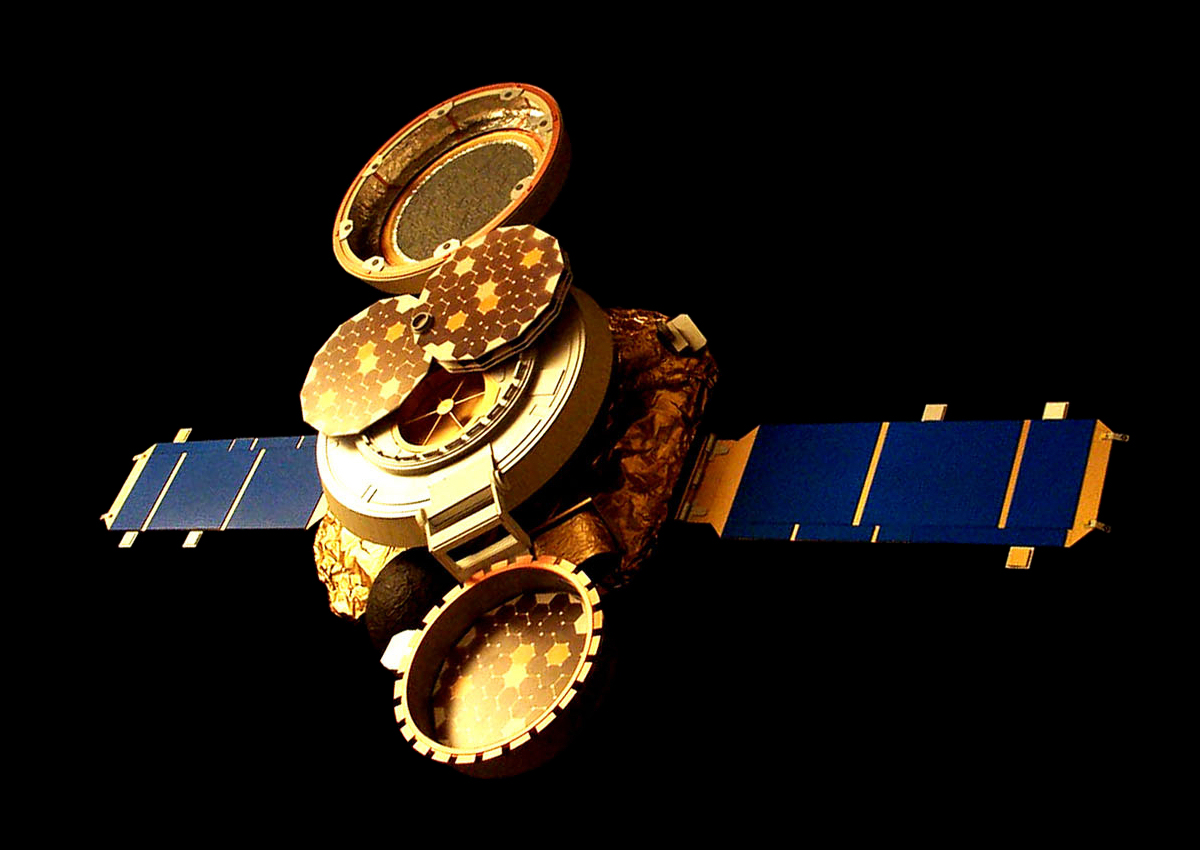
An artist's rendering of Genesis collecting solar wind.

The next mission to return extraterrestrial samples was the Genesis mission, which returned solar wind samples to Earth from beyond Earth orbit in 2004. Unfortunately, the Genesis capsule failed to open its parachute while re-entering the Earth's atmosphere and crash-landed in the Utah desert. There were fears of severe contamination or even total mission loss, but scientists managed to save many of the samples. They were the first to be collected from beyond lunar orbit. Genesis used a collector array made of wafers of ultra-pure silicon, gold, sapphire, and diamond. Each different wafer was used to collect a different part of the solar wind.

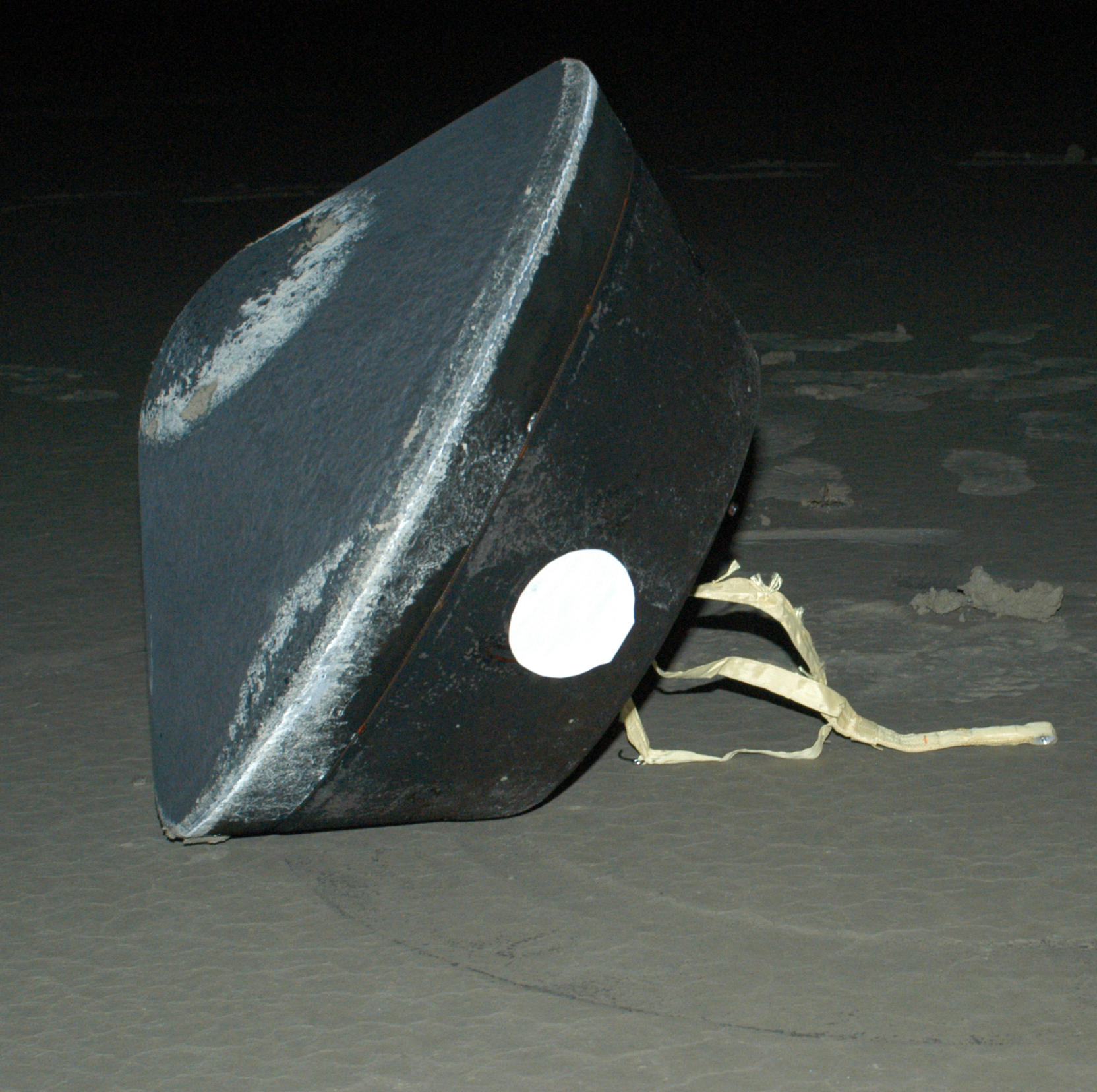
Sample-return capsule from the Stardust mission

Genesis was followed by NASA's Stardust spacecraft, which returned comet samples to Earth on 15 January 2006. It safely passed by Comet Wild 2 and collected dust samples from the comet's coma while imaging the comet's nucleus. Stardust used a collector array made of low-density aerogel (99% of which is space), which has about 1/1000 of the density of glass. This enables the collection of cometary particles without damaging them due to high impact velocities. Particle collisions with even slightly porous solid collectors would result in the destruction of those particles and damage to the collection apparatus. During the cruise, the array collected at least seven interstellar dust particles.

=== 2010s and 2020s ===
In June 2010 the Japan Aerospace Exploration Agency (JAXA) Hayabusa probe returned asteroid samples to Earth after a rendezvous with (and a landing on) S-type asteroid 25143 Itokawa. In November 2010, scientists at the agency confirmed that, despite failure of the sampling device, the probe retrieved micrograms of dust from the asteroid, the first brought back to Earth in pristine condition.

The Russian Fobos-Grunt was a failed sample-return mission designed to return samples from Phobos, one of the moons of Mars. It was launched on 8 November 2011, but failed to leave Earth orbit and crashed after several weeks into the southern Pacific Ocean.

OSIRIS-REx collecting a sample from asteroid 101955 Bennu — (Full-sized image)

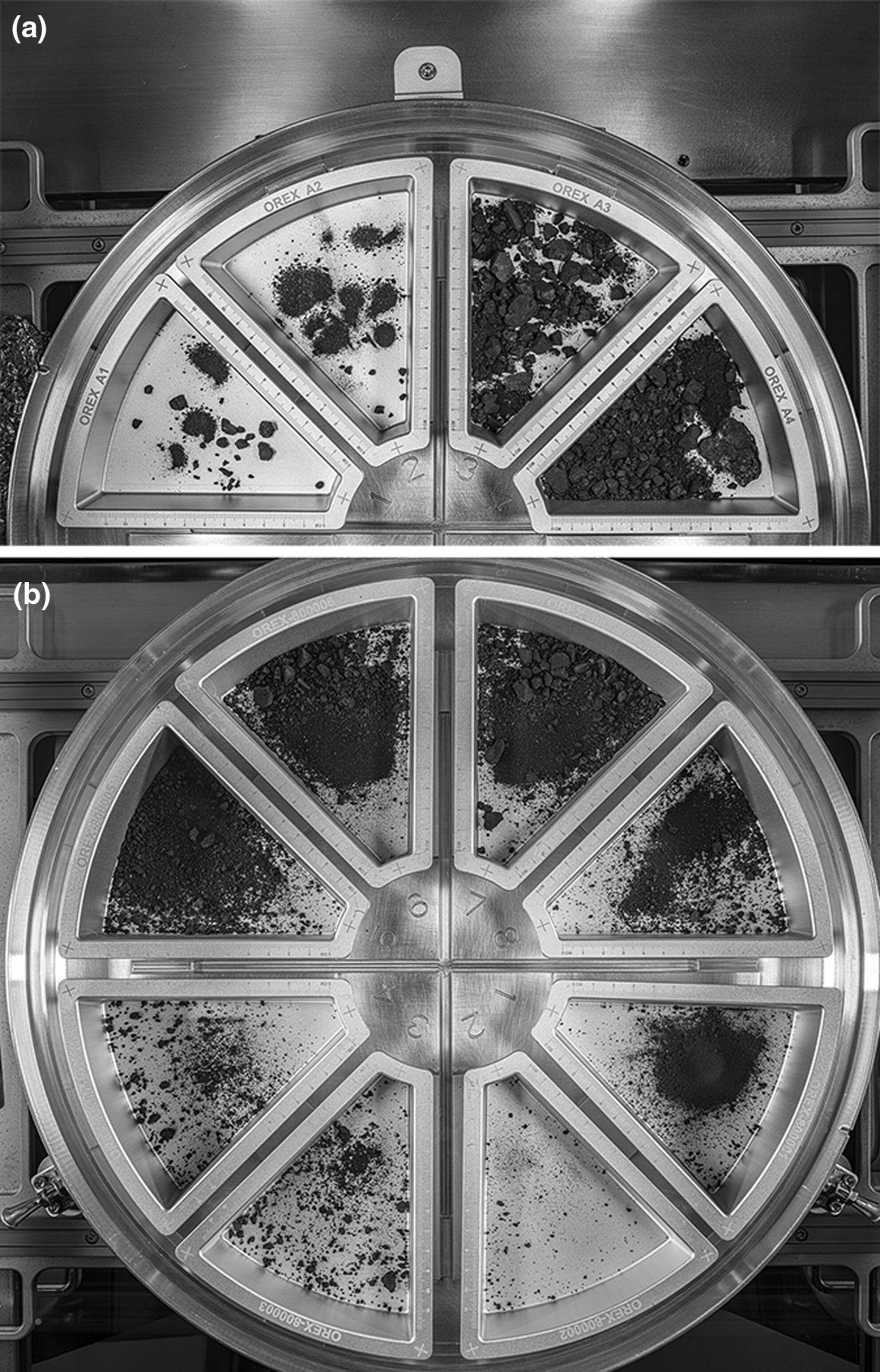
Samples from Bennu delivered to Earth

JAXA launched the improved Hayabusa2 space probe on 3 December 2014. Hayabusa2 arrived at the target near-Earth C-type asteroid 162173 Ryugu (previously designated 1999 JU3) on 27 June 2018. It surveyed the asteroid for a year and a half and took samples. It left the asteroid in November 2019 and returned to Earth on 6 December 2020.

The OSIRIS-REx mission was launched in September 2016 on a mission to return samples from the asteroid 101955 Bennu. The samples are expected to enable scientists to learn more about the time before the birth of the Solar System, initial stages of planet formation, and the source of organic compounds that led to the formation of life. It reached the proximity of Bennu on 3 December 2018, where it began analyzing its surface for a target sample area over the next several months. It collected its sample on 20 October 2020, and landed back on Earth again on 24 September 2023, making OSIRIS-REx the fifth successful sample return mission for mankind, in its return of samples from an extra-terrestrial body. Shortly after the sample container was retrieved and transferred to an "airtight chamber at the Johnson Space Center in Houston, Texas", the lid on the container was opened. Scientists commented that they "found black dust and debris on the avionics deck of the OSIRIS-REx science canister" on the initial opening. Later study was planned. On 11 October 2023, the recovered capsule was opened to reveal a "first look" at the asteroid sample contents. On 13 December 2023, further studies of the returned sample were reported and revealed organic molecules as well as unknown materials which require more study to have a better idea of their composition and makeup. On 13 January 2024, NASA reported finally fully opening, after three months of trying, the recovered container with samples from the Bennu asteroid. The total weight of the recovered material weighed 121.6 g (4.29 oz), over twice the mission's goal.

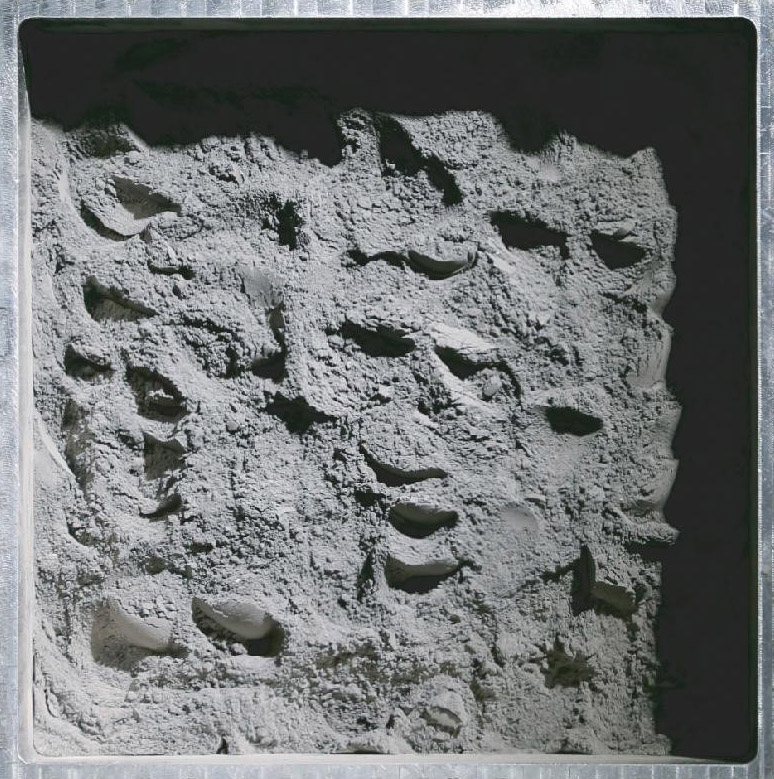
First lunar regolith sample from the far side of the Moon collected by China's Chang'e 6 mission.

China's CNSA launched the Chang'e 5 and 6 lunar sample-return mission on 23 November 2020 and 3 May 2024 respectively, which returned to Earth with 2 kilograms of lunar soil each on 16 December 2020 and 25 June 2024 respectively. These were the first lunar sample-return missions in over 40 years. The Chang'e 6 mission, which landed in the Apollo crater basin in the southern hemisphere of the lunar far side, was the first to retrieve samples from the far side of the Moon, as all previous collective lunar samples having been collected from the near side.

=== Current missions ===
CNSA's Tianwen-2 was launched in May 2025 with the aim to return samples from 469219 Kamoʻoalewa.

On 19 October 2026, JAXA launched the MMX mission, a sample-return mission meant to collect material from Phobos. MMX will study both moons of Mars, but the landing and the sample collection will be on Phobos. This selection was made because of the two moons, Phobos's orbit is closer to Mars and its surface may have particles blasted from Mars. Thus, the sample may contain material originating on Mars itself. MMX is expected to arrive at Mars in 2026, conduct its Deimos sampling in late 2028 or early 2029, and return it to Earth in 2031.

=== Future missions ===
CNSA has plans for Tianwen-3, a Mars sample return mission launching in 2028.

NASA and ESA have long planned a Mars Sample-Return Mission. The Perseverance rover, deployed in 2020, is collecting drill core samples and stashing them on the Martian surface. As of September 2023, it has gathered one atmospheric sample and 8 igneous rock samples, 11 sedimentary rock samples and a pair of regolith samples. On 22 November 2023, NASA announced that it was cutting back on the Mars sample-return mission due to a shortage of funds. In January 2024, the proposed NASA plan was challenged due to budget and scheduling considerations, and investigation into alternate plans begun.

Russia has plans for Luna-Glob missions to return samples from the Moon by 2027 and Mars-Grunt to return samples from Mars in the late 2020s.

== Methods of sample return ==
Animation of TAGSAM arm moving

Sample-return methods include, but are not restricted to the following:

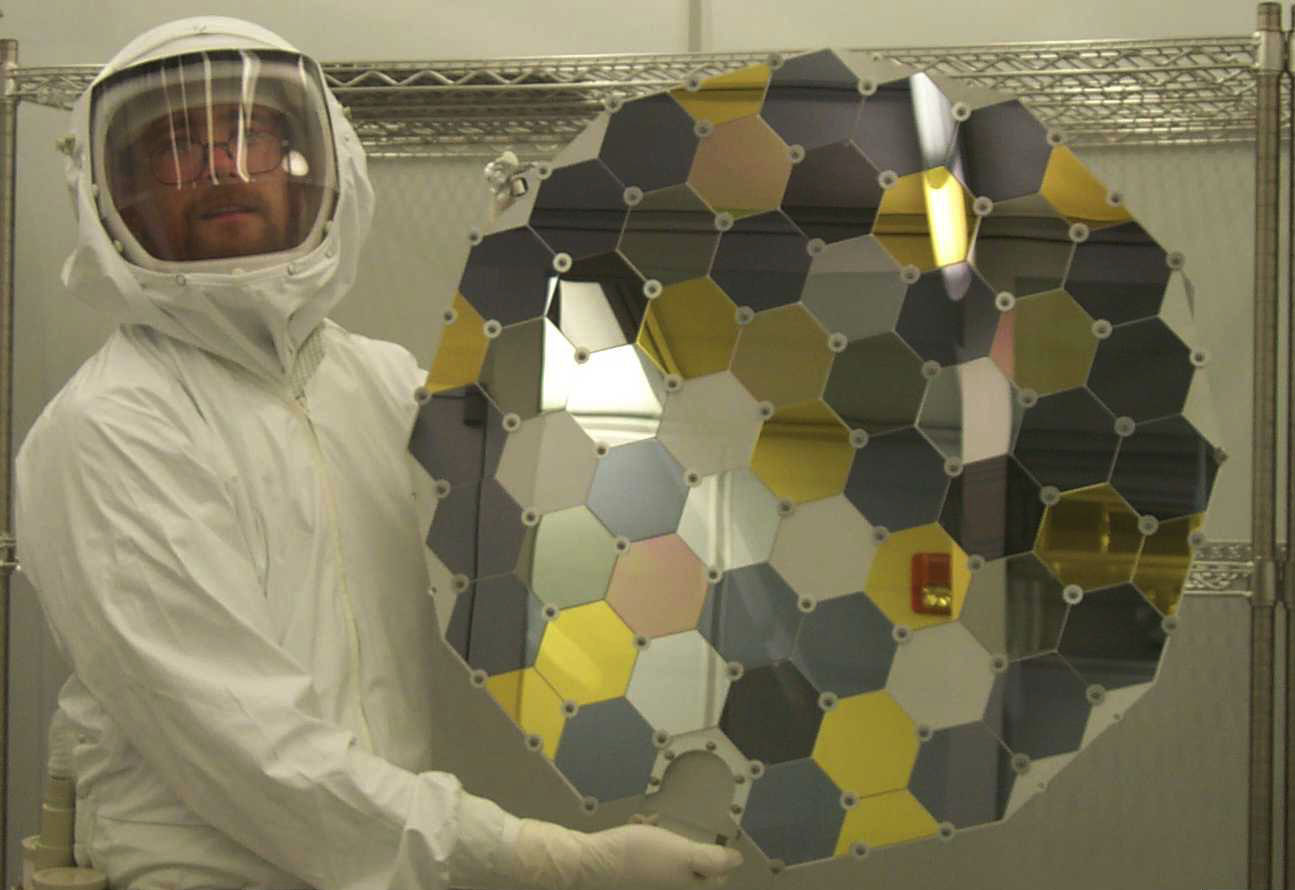
A Genesis collector array consisting of a grid of ultra-pure wafers of silicon, gold, sapphire, and diamond

=== Collector array ===
A collector array may be used to collect millions or billions of atoms, molecules, and fine particulates by using wafers made of different elements. The molecular structure of these wafers allows the collection of various sizes of particles. Collector arrays, such as those flown on Genesis, are ultra-pure in order to ensure maximal collection efficiency, durability, and analytical distinguishability.

Collector arrays are useful for collecting tiny, fast-moving atoms such as those expelled by the Sun through the solar wind, but can also be used for collection of larger particles such as those found in the coma of a comet. The NASA spacecraft known as Stardust implemented this technique. However, due to the high speeds and size of the particles that make up the coma and the area nearby, a dense solid-state collector array was not viable. As a result, another means for collecting samples had to be designed to preserve the safety of the spacecraft and the samples themselves.

==== Aerogel ====
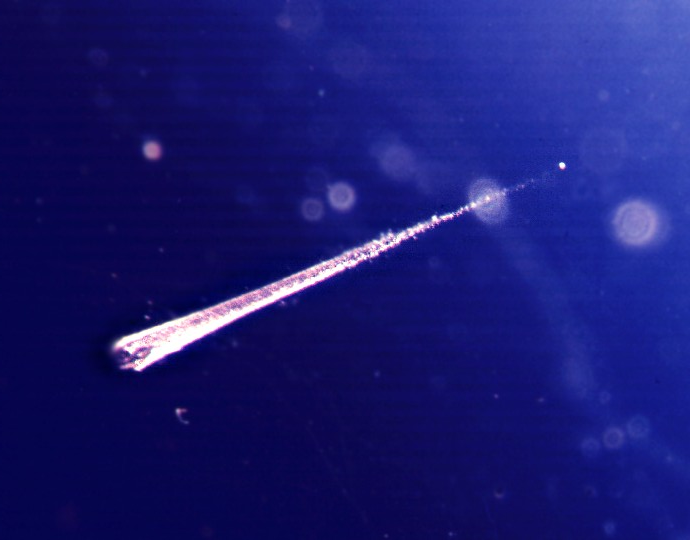
A particle captured in aerogel

Aerogel is a silica-based porous solid with a sponge-like structure, 99.8% of whose volume is empty space. Aerogel has about 1/1000 of the density of glass. An aerogel was used in the Stardust spacecraft because the dust particles the spacecraft was to collect would have an impact speed of about 6 km/s. A collision with a dense solid at that speed could alter their chemical composition or vaporize them completely.

Since the aerogel is mostly transparent, and the particles leave a carrot-shaped path once they penetrate the surface, scientists can easily find and retrieve them. Since its pores are on the nanometer scale, particles, even ones smaller than a grain of sand, do not merely pass through the aerogel completely. Instead, they slow to a stop and then are embedded within it. The Stardust spacecraft has a tennis-racket-shaped collector with aerogel fitted to it. The collector is retracted into its capsule for safe storage and delivery back to Earth. Aerogel is quite strong and easily survives both launching and space environments.

=== Robotic excavation and return ===
The risks and difficulties of sample-return missions that require landing on an extraterrestrial body, such as an asteroid, moon, or planet are mostly given by the time, financial and technical resources needed to initiate such plans. High precision and accuracy are required to assure that everything including launch, landing, retrieval and launch back to Earth go smoothly.

This type of sample return, although having the most risks, is the most rewarding for planetary science. Furthermore, such missions carry a great deal of public outreach potential, which is an important attribute for space exploration when it comes to public support. The only successful robotic sample-return missions of this type have been Soviet Luna and Chinese Chang'e lunar landers. While other missions collected materials from asteroids by various means, they did so without "landing", given their very low gravity.

== List of missions ==
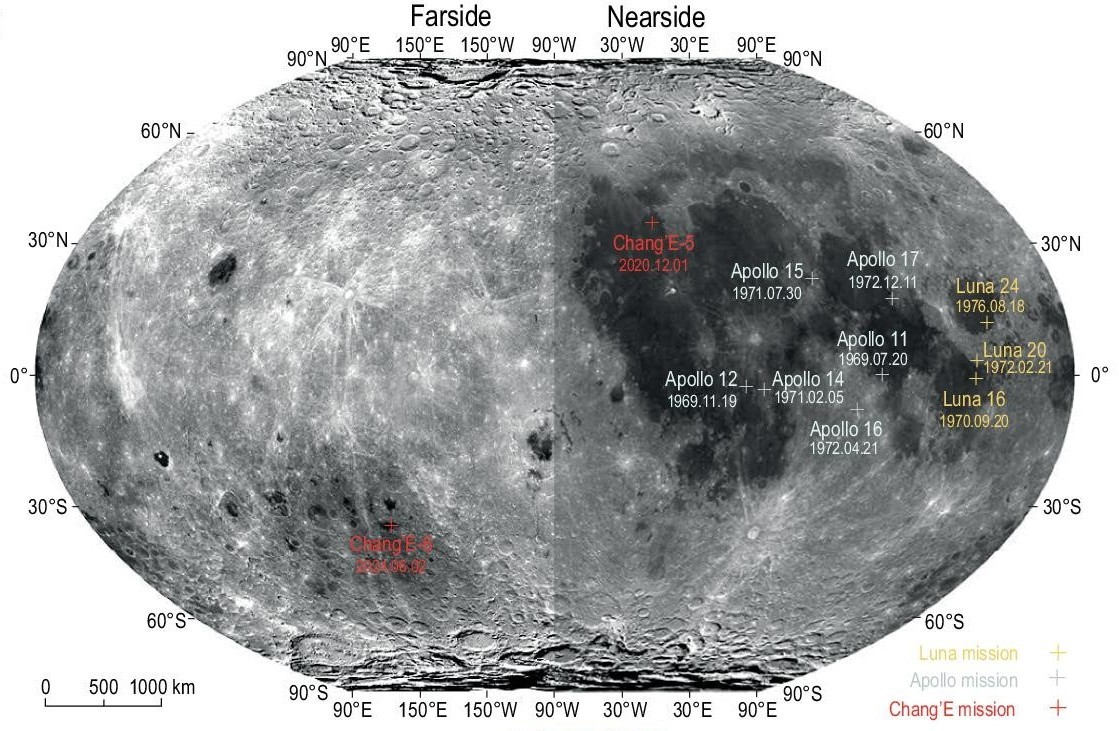
Map of sample-return missions on the Moon as of 2024.

=== Crewed missions ===
Launch date	Operator	Name	Sample origin	Samples returned	Recovery date	Mission result
16 July 1969	United States	Apollo 11	Moon	22 kilograms (49 lb)	24 July 1969	Success
14 November 1969	United States	Apollo 12	Moon	34 kilograms (75 lb) and Surveyor 3 parts (Note: The Apollo 12 astronauts removed several components from Surveyor 3, including the television camera, and returned them to Earth, where they are treated as lunar samples by NASA. It returned about 10 kilograms (22 lb) of the Surveyor 3's original landing mass of 302 kilograms (666 lb) to Earth to study the effects of long term exposure. Surveyor 3 is the only probe visited by humans on another world.)	24 November 1969	Success
11 April 1970	United States	Apollo 13	Moon	—N/a	17 April 1970	Failure
31 January 1971	United States	Apollo 14	Moon	43 kilograms (95 lb)	9 February 1971	Success
26 July 1971	United States	Apollo 15	Moon	77 kilograms (170 lb)	7 August 1971	Success
16 April 1972	United States	Apollo 16	Moon	95 kilograms (209 lb)	27 April 1972	Success
7 December 1972	United States	Apollo 17	Moon	111 kilograms (245 lb)	19 December 1972	Success
22 March 1996	Russia	Earth-Orbital Debris Collection	Low Earth orbit	Particles	6 October 1997	Success
14 April 2015	Japan	Tanpopo mission	Low Earth orbit	Particles	February 2018	Success

=== Space probe missions ===
Launch date	Operator	Name	Sample origin	Samples returned	Recovery date	Mission result
14 June 1969	Soviet Union	Luna E-8-5 No. 402	Moon	—N/a	—N/a	Failure
13 July 1969	Soviet Union	Luna 15	Moon	—N/a	—N/a	Failure
23 September 1969	Soviet Union	Kosmos 300	Moon	—N/a	—N/a	Failure
22 October 1969	Soviet Union	Kosmos 305	Moon	—N/a	—N/a	Failure
6 February 1970	Soviet Union	Luna E-8-5 No. 405	Moon	—N/a	—N/a	Failure
12 September 1970	Soviet Union	Luna 16	Moon	101 grams (3.6 oz)	24 September 1970	Success
2 September 1971	Soviet Union	Luna 18	Moon	—N/a	—N/a	Failure
14 February 1972	Soviet Union	Luna 20	Moon	55 grams (1.9 oz)	25 February 1972	Success
2 November 1974	Soviet Union	Luna 23	Moon	—N/a	—N/a	Failure
16 October 1975	Soviet Union	Luna E-8-5M No. 412	Moon	—N/a	—N/a	Failure
9 August 1976	Soviet Union	Luna 24	Moon	170 grams (6.0 oz)	22 August 1976	Success
7 February 1999	United States	Stardust	81P/Wild	Particles, weighing approx 1 milligram (0.015 gr)	15 January 2006	Success
8 August 2001	United States	Genesis	Solar wind	Particles	9 September 2004	Partial success
9 May 2003	Japan	Hayabusa	25143 Itokawa	Particles, weighing less than 1 gram (0.035 oz)	13 June 2010	Partial success
8 November 2011	Russia	Fobos-Grunt	Phobos	—N/a	—N/a	Failure
3 December 2014	Japan	Hayabusa2	162173 Ryugu	5.4 grams (0.19 oz) (including gas samples)	6 December 2020	Success
8 September 2016	United States	OSIRIS-REx	101955 Bennu	121.6 grams (4.29 oz)	24 September 2023	Success
23 November 2020	China	Chang'e 5	Moon	1,731 grams (61.1 oz)	16 December 2020	Success
3 May 2024	China	Chang'e 6	Moon	1,935.3 grams (68.27 oz)	25 June 2024	Success
29 May 2025	China	Tianwen-2	469219 Kamoʻoalewa	—N/a	2027	Ongoing
19 October 2026	Japan	MMX	Phobos	—N/a	2031	Ongoing
2028	India	Chandrayaan-4	Moon	—N/a	2028	Planned
2028	China	Tianwen-3	Mars	—N/a	2031	Planned

== See also ==
- Asteroid mining
- Exploration of Mars
- Exploration of the Moon
- Extraterrestrial sample curation
- List of lunar probes
- Timeline of Solar System exploration
