= Luna E-8-5M No. 412 =

Soviet space probe (Luna 1975A)

E-8-5M No.412
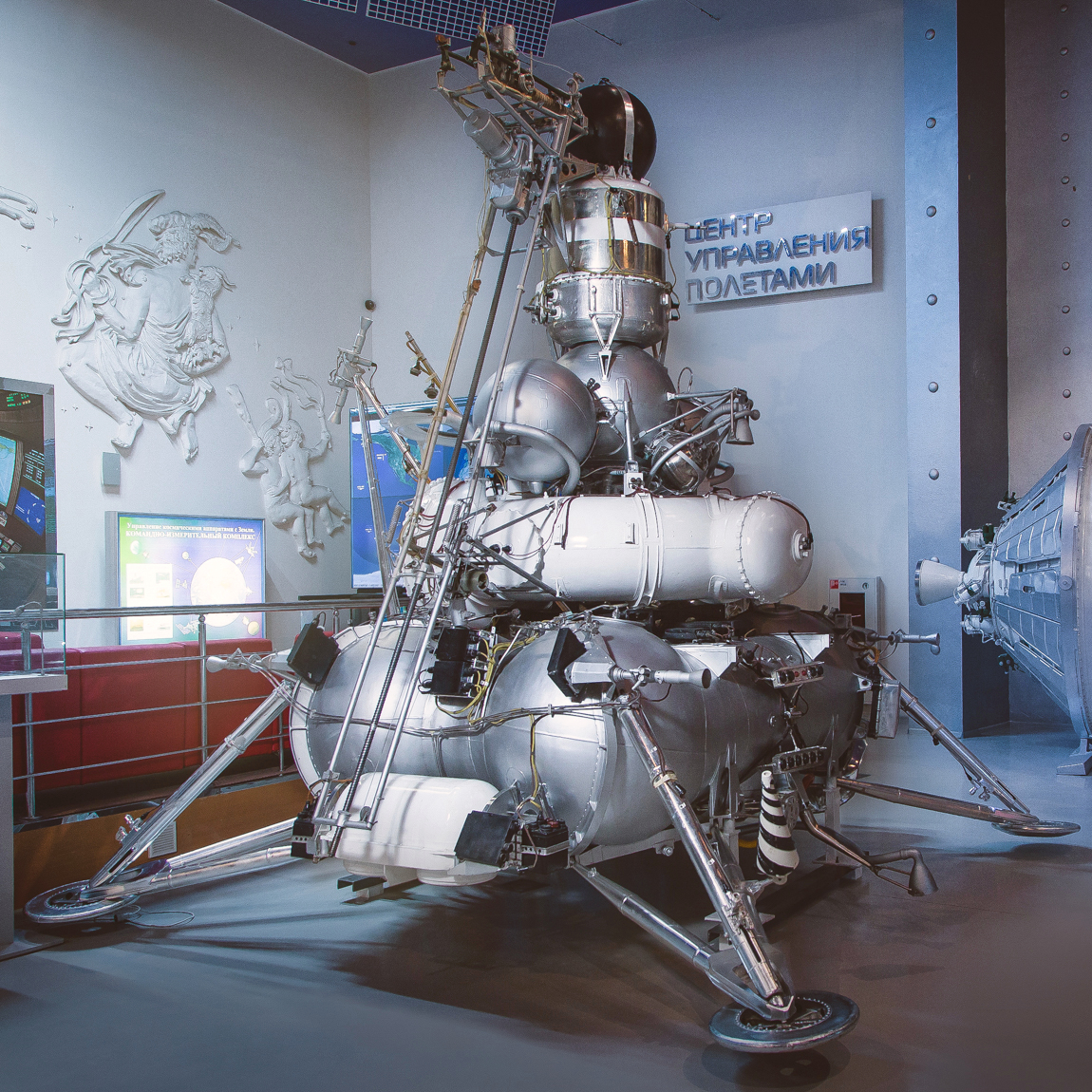
- A Ye-8-5M model
- Names: Luna 1975A
- Mission type: Lunar sample-return
- Operator: Soviet space program
- Mission duration: Launch failure

Spacecraft properties
- Spacecraft type: Luna
- Bus: Ye-8-5
- Manufacturer: NPO Lavochkin
- Launch mass: 5,750 kg (12,680 lb)

Start of mission
- Launch date: 16 October 1975, 04:04:56 UTC
- Rocket: Proton-K/D-1 s/n 287-02
- Launch site: Baikonur 81/23
- Contractor: Khrunichev

Orbital parameters
- Reference system: Selenocentric (planned)

Lunar lander
- Landing site: Mare Crisium (planned)

Instruments
- Stereo photographic imaging system Improved drill/Remote arm for sample collection Radiation detector Radio-altimeter

Luna E-8-5M No.412, also known as Luna Ye-8-5M No.412, and sometimes identified by NASA as Luna 1975A, was a Soviet spacecraft which was lost in a launch failure in 1975. It was a 5,300 kg (11,700 lb) Luna E-8-5M spacecraft, the second of three to be launched. It was intended to perform a soft landing on the Moon, collect a sample of lunar soil, and return it to the Earth.

== History ==
Luna E-8-5M No.412 was launched at 04:04:56 UTC on 16 October 1975 atop a Proton-K 8K78K launch vehicle with a Blok D-1 upper stage, flying from Site 81/23 at the Baikonur Cosmodrome. The Blok D stage experienced a failure of the LOX turbopump and so the probe did not reach orbit.

Prior to the release of information about its mission, NASA correctly identified that it had been an attempted sample return mission. They believed that it was intended to land in Mare Crisium, which was the target for both the Luna 23 and Luna 24 missions; which landed a few hundred metres apart. Since its launch was unsuccessful, it was not acknowledged in the Soviet press at the time.
