= Mars 5M =

Cancelled Mars sample return mission

Mars 5M, also known as Mars 79 (Russian: Марс-5М, or Марс-79) was a cancelled Mars sample return mission that the Soviet Union was planning in the 1970s.

== History ==
Mars 5M grew out of the Mars 5NM and Mars 4NM missions that were canceled along with their intended launch vehicle, the N1 rocket, in 1974. The following year, Soviet Minister of Defence Dmitry Ustinov, at the urging of Alexander Pavlovich Vinogradov, directed Lavochkin to develop 5M as a sample return mission to launch in 1980.

The launch vehicle was to be the heavy Proton rocket, using two rockets to send the 8,500 kilograms (18,700 lb) lander out of Earth orbit to Mars, where it would land, collect samples, and separate for return, with a 2,000 kilograms (4,400 lb) stage returning to Mars orbit to rendezvous with a return spacecraft delivered by another Proton. The return craft was originally to dock with a station in Earth orbit, though in the final design, which was completed in January 1976, had it travel directly to Earth after sterilizing the samples via heat. To save weight, the return craft would crash land on earth without parachutes, and would be located via a radioactive beacon. Though the Soviet government approved the mission, and production of equipment began in 1977, it was later deemed unfeasible and with proponent Vinogradov having died it was canceled by the end of the year.
