= Lavochkin =

Russian Aerospace Company

- Native name: Научно-производственное объединение имени С. А. Лавочкина
- Formerly: OKB-301
- Type: State-owned company
- Industry: Space industry Aerospace industry Defense industry
- Founded: 1937
- Headquarters: Khimki, Moscow region, Russia
- Key people: Georgy Babakin (Chief Designer 1965 - 1971); Semyon Lavochkin (Chief Designer 1940 - 1960)
- Products: Spacecraft, space probes, satellites, aircraft, missiles, ballistic missiles
- Revenue: $275 million (2017)
- Operating income: $8.54 million (2017)
- Net income: $8.16 million (2017)
- Total assets: $862 million (2017)
- Total equity: $154 million (2017)
- Number of employees: 5000
- Parent: Roscosmos
- Website: www.laspace.ru

NPO Lavochkin (Russian: НПО Лавочкина, OKB-301, also called Lavochkin Research and Production Association or shortly Lavochkin Association, LA) is a Russian aerospace company. It is a major player in the Russian space program, being the developer and manufacturer of the Fregat upper stage, as well as interplanetary probes such as Fobos-Grunt. As of 2015, it was headed by Sergei Lemeshevskii. On 10 August 2017 the Lavochkin Association's Board of Directors appointed Vladimir Kolmykov Director General of the enterprise.

== Overview ==
The company develops and manufactures spacecraft such as the Fregat rocket upper stages, satellites and interplanetary probes. It is a contractor for a number of military programs, such as the Oko early warning satellite, Prognoz and Araks programmes as well as the civilian program Kupon. One of the company's most notable projects was the participation in the failed Fobos-Grunt sample return mission. NPO Lavochkin has also developed the Elektro–L series of new-generation weather satellites, as well as the Navigator standardised satellite platform, which will serve as the basis for several future Russian satellites.

The company also produced civilian items in the 1970s and 80s, such as the Irbis brand of climbing and mountaineering gear (carabiners, ice screws etc.).

== History ==
The company was founded in 1937 as OKB-301, a Soviet aircraft design bureau (OKB). The head designer was Vladimir P. Gorbunov, supported by Mikhail Gudkov and Semyon Lavochkin. In October 1945 Lavochkin was promoted for the head designer of the design bureau. The bureau gained distinction for its family of piston-engined fighter aircraft during World War II, and later shifted to missile and jet fighter designs. Following the death of the head designer, the OKB-301 succumbed to the growing power of Vladimir Chelomey and became OKB-52 Branch No. 3 on 18 December 1962. Later, it turned to work on interplanetary probe designs for Luna sample return program, the Lunokhod program, Vega program, Phobos program, etc. The former OKB-301 became named NPO Lavochkin.

In January 2012, officials of Lavochkin faced administrative punishment for not taking into account of designing the computer system after the crash of Russia's Mars moon spacecraft Fobos-Grunt.

== Projects ==
=== Aircraft ===
- LaGG-1
- LaGG-3
- Gu-82
- K-37
- Gu-1
- La-5
- La-7 "Fin"
- La-9 "Fritz"
- La-11 "Fang"
- La-15 "Fantail"
- La-17
- La-120
- La-126
- La-130
- La-132
- La-134
- La-138
- La-140
- La-150
- La-152
- La-154
- La-156
- La-160
- La-168
- La-174
- La-176
- La-180
- La-190
- La-200
- La-250 Anakonda

=== Rockets and missiles ===
- S-25 Berkut (SA-1 "Guild") - surface-to-air missile
- S-75 Dvina (SA-2 "Guideline") - surface-to-air missile
- La-205 is V-300, a SAM for S-25 air defense system
- La-350 Burya - intercontinental cruise missile
- La-400 DAL - surface to air missile
- Fregat - upper stage

=== Spacecraft ===
- Astron
- Elektro-L - satellite
  - Elektro-L No.1
  - Elektro-L No.2
- Fobos-Grunt - space probe
- Granat - satellite
- Living Interplanetary Flight Experiment - space probe
- Luna programme
  - Luna 9
  - Luna 10
  - Luna 11
  - Luna 12
  - Luna 13
  - Luna 14
  - Luna 15
  - Luna 16
  - Luna 17
  - Luna 18
  - Luna 19
  - Luna 20
  - Luna 21
  - Luna 22
  - Luna 23
  - Luna 24
  - Luna 25
  - Luna E-8 No.201
  - Luna E-8-5 No.402
  - Luna E-8-5 No.405
  - Luna E-8-5M No.412
- Lunokhod programme
  - Lunokhod 1
  - Lunokhod 2
- Mars program
  - Mars 2M No.521
  - Mars 2M No.522
  - Mars 4
  - Mars 5
  - Mars 5M
  - Mars 6
  - Mars 7
- Mars-96
- Oko - missile early warning satellite.
  - US-K - satellite
  - US-KMO - satellite
  - US-KS - satellite
- Spektr-R - space radio telescope satellite, dedicated to very Long Baseline Interferometry
- Spektr-RG - space observatory satellite
- Venera program
  - Venera 3
  - Venera 4
  - Venera 5
  - Venera 7
  - Venera 8
  - Venera 9
  - Kosmos 167
- Vega program
  - Vega 1
  - Vega 2

=== Future projects ===
- Luna-Glob
- Mars-Grunt - space probe

== Designers and engineers ==
- Georgy Babakin
- Semyon Lavochkin
- Yuri Koptev, later director of Roscosmos, worked at Lavochkin from 1965

== Awards ==
- 1944 — Order of Lenin: for the creation of new types of fighter aircraft during the Great Patriotic War (the OKB-21 team led by S. A. Lavochkin in Gorky).
- 1956 — Order of the Red Banner of Labour: for the successful completion of the government's task to create special equipment.
- 1971 — Order of the Red Banner of Labour: for the successful implementation of the five-year plan and the organization of production of new equipment.

== Museum ==
The S. A. Lavochkin NGO has its own museum. It was founded on June 25, 1965. Museum address: 24 Leningradskaya str., Khimki, Moscow region, 141400. The visit is only subject to prior requests.

== See also ==
- Babakin Space Centre
