= Luna 18 =

Space probe

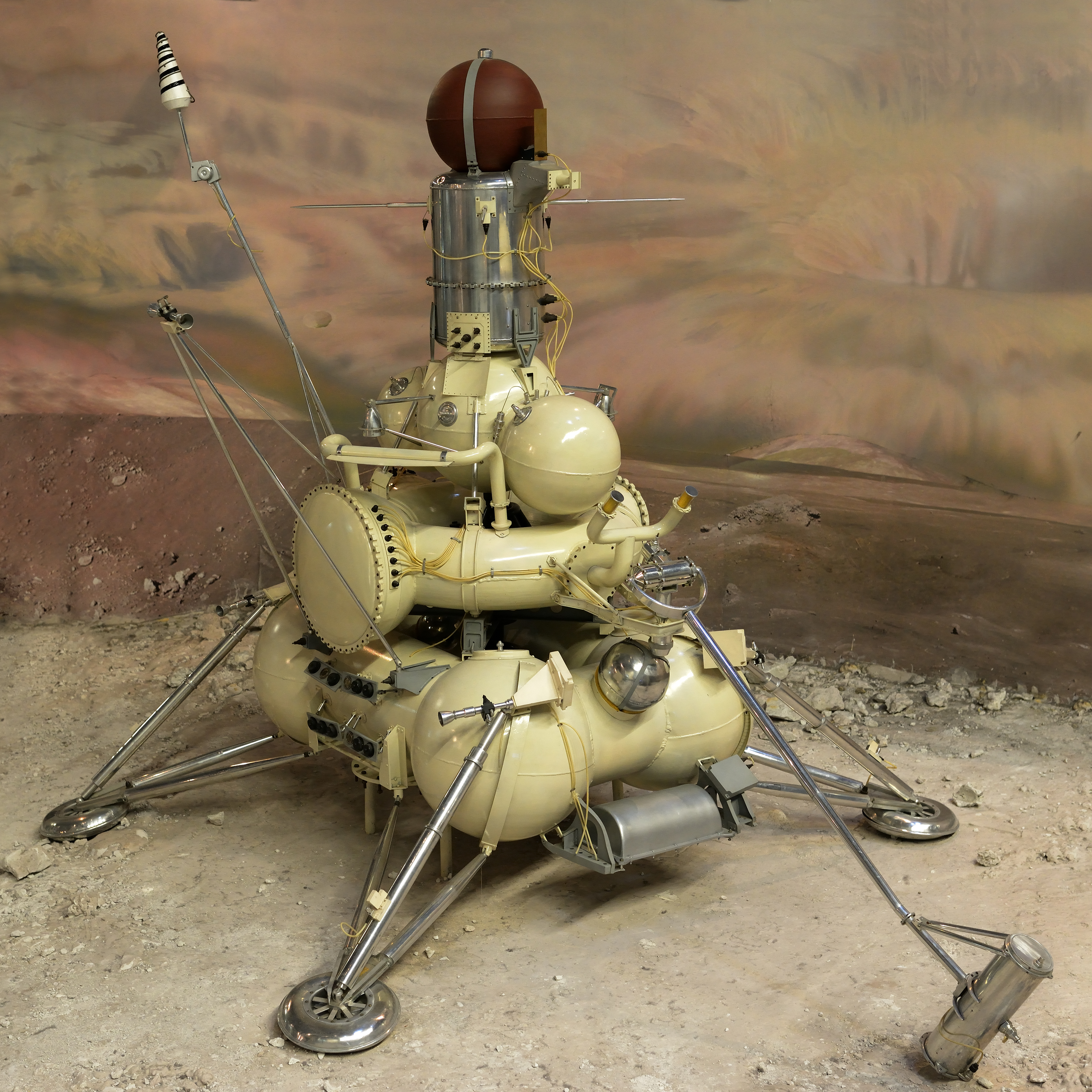
- A Ye-8-5 model in the Museum of Cosmonautics, Moscow.
- Mission type: Lunar sample return
- Operator: Soviet space program
- COSPAR ID: 1971-073A
- SATCAT no.: 5448
- Mission duration: 9 days (launch day to day of last contact)

Spacecraft properties
- Bus: Ye-8-5
- Manufacturer: GSMZ Lavochkin
- Launch mass: 5,725 kilograms (12,621 lb)
- Dry mass: 5,600 kilograms (12,300 lb)

Start of mission
- Launch date: 2 September 1971, 13:40:40 UTC
- Rocket: Proton-K/D
- Launch site: Baikonur 81/24

End of mission
- Last contact: 11 September 1971, 07:48 UTC

Orbital parameters
- Reference system: Selenocentric
- Eccentricity: 0.001361
- Periselene altitude: 1,824.9 kilometres (1,133.9 mi)
- Aposelene altitude: 1,842.3 kilometres (1,144.8 mi)
- Inclination: 35 degrees
- Period: 119 minutes
- Epoch: 6 September 1971, 20:00:00 UTC

Lunar orbiter
- Orbital insertion: 7 September 1971
- Orbits: 54

Lunar impact (failed landing)
- Impact date: 11 September 1971 07:48 UTC
- Impact site: 3°34′N 56°30′E

Instruments
- Stereo photographic imaging system Remote arm for sample collection Radiation detector Radio altimeter

Luna 18, part of the Ye-8-5 series, was an uncrewed space mission of the Luna program.

== Overview ==
Luna 18 was placed in an Earth parking orbit after it was launched and was then sent towards the Moon. On 7 September 1971, it entered lunar orbit. The spacecraft completed 85 communications sessions and 54 lunar orbits before it was sent towards the lunar surface by use of braking rockets. It impacted the Moon on 11 September 1971, at 3 degrees 34 minutes N, 56 degrees 30 minutes E (selenographic coordinates) in rugged mountainous terrain. Signals ceased at the moment of impact.

This mission was the seventh Soviet attempt to recover soil samples from the surface of the Moon and the first after the success of Luna 16. After two mid-course corrections on 4 September and 6 September 1971, Luna 18 entered a circular orbit around the Moon on 7 September at 100 kilometers altitude with an inclination of 35°. After several more orbital corrections, on 11 September, the vehicle began its descent to the lunar surface. Contact with the spacecraft was lost at 07:48 UT at the previously determined point of lunar landing. Impact coordinates were 3°34' north latitude and 56°30' east longitude, near the edge of the Mare Fecunditatis ("Sea of Fertility"). Officially, the Soviets announced that "the lunar landing in the complex mountainous conditions proved to be unfavorable." Later, in 1975, the Soviets published data from Luna 18's continuous-wave radio altimeter that determined the mean density of the lunar topsoil.

== See also ==
- List of artificial objects on the Moon
- List of missions to the Moon
