= Luna E-8-5 No. 405 =

Soviet space probe (Luna 1970A)

E-8-5 No.405
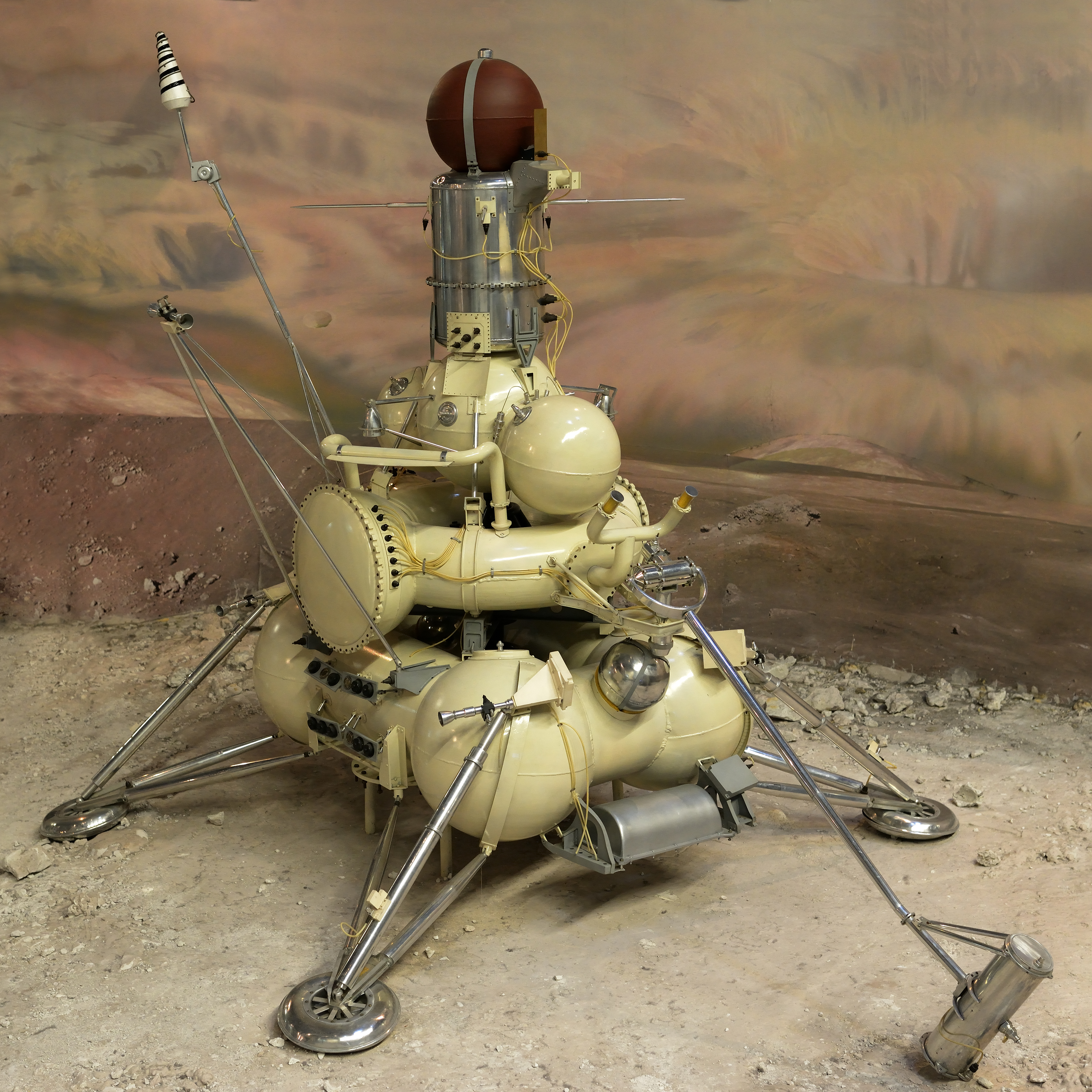
- A Ye-8-5 model in the Museum of Cosmonautics, Moscow.
- Mission type: Lunar lander Sample return
- Operator: Soviet space program
- Mission duration: Failed to orbit

Spacecraft properties
- Spacecraft type: E-8-5
- Manufacturer: NPO Lavochkin
- Launch mass: 5,600 kilograms (12,300 lb)

Start of mission
- Launch date: 6 February 1970, 04:16:06 UTC
- Rocket: Proton-K/D s/n 247-01
- Launch site: Baikonur 81/23

Luna E-8-5 No.405, also known as Luna Ye-8-5 No.405, and sometimes identified by NASA as Luna 1970A, was a Soviet spacecraft which was lost in a launch failure in 1970. It was a 5,600-kilogram (12,300 lb) Luna E-8-5 spacecraft, the fifth of eight to be launched. It was intended to perform a soft landing on the Moon, collect a sample of lunar soil, and return it to the Earth.

== Launch ==
Luna E-8-5 No.405 was launched at 04:16:06 UTC on 6 February 1970 atop a Proton-K 8K78K carrier rocket with a Blok-D upper stage, flying from Site 81/23 at the Baikonur Cosmodrome. A defective pressure sensor caused the first stage to shut down 128 seconds after launch. The booster crashed downrange. Prior to the release of information about its mission, NASA correctly identified that it had been an attempted sample return mission.
