= Luna 24 =

Final Soviet sample-return mission to the Moon, 1976

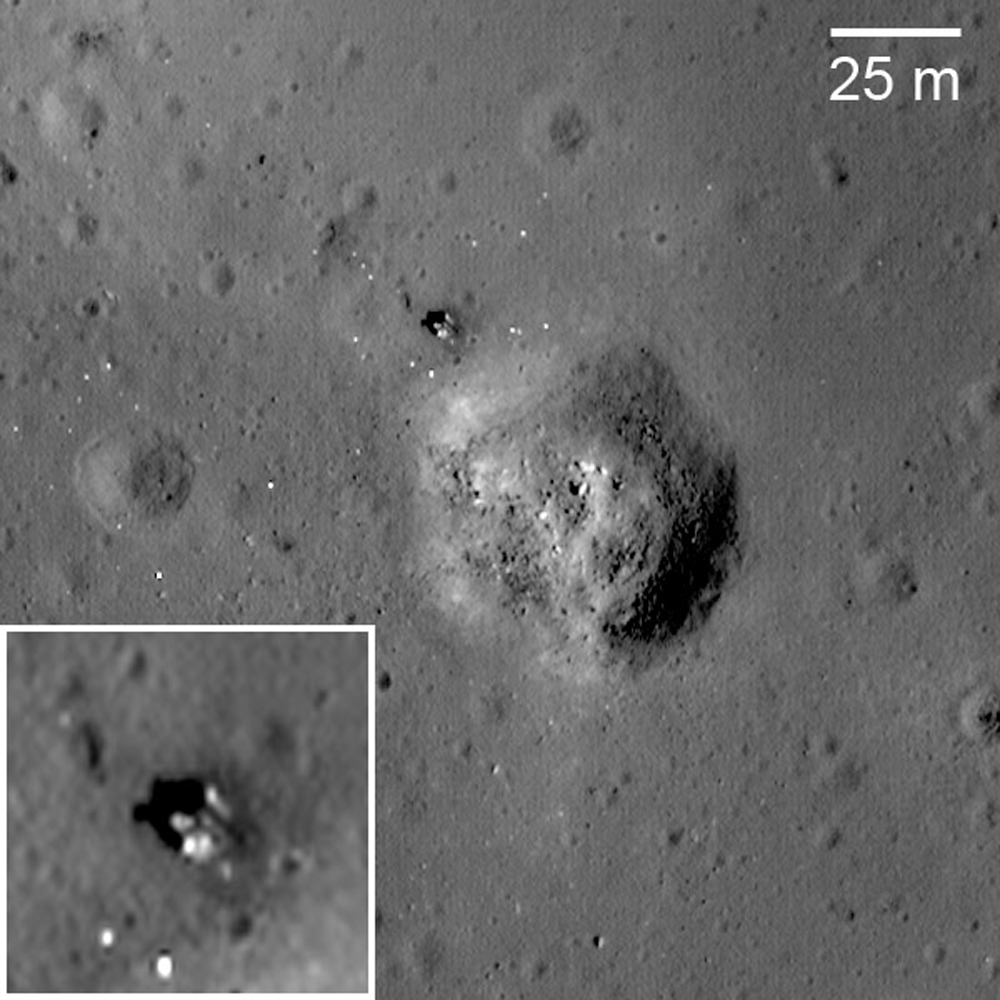
- Luna 24 landed on the northwestern rim of a 64 m diameter impact crater Lev, on the volcanic plains of Mare Crisium
- Mission type: Lunar sample return
- Operator: Soviet space program
- COSPAR ID: 1976-081A
- SATCAT no.: 9272
- Mission duration: 12 days, 14 hours and 51 minutes

Spacecraft properties
- Bus: Ye-8-5M
- Manufacturer: NPO Lavochkin
- Launch mass: 5,800 kg (12,800 lb)

Start of mission
- Launch date: 9 August 1976, 15:04:12 UTC
- Rocket: Proton-K/DM s/n 288-02
- Launch site: Baikonur 81/23
- Contractor: Krunichev

End of mission
- Landing date: 22 August 1976, 05:55 UTC
- Landing site: 61°3′36″N 75°54′0″E, 200 km (120 mi) South-East of Surgut, Western Siberia

Orbital parameters
- Reference system: Selenocentric
- Periselene altitude: 115 km (71 mi)
- Aposelene altitude: 115 km (71 mi)
- Inclination: 120.0°
- Period: 1 hour 59 minutes

Lunar orbiter
- Orbital insertion: 14 August 1976
- Orbits: ~48

Lunar lander
- Landing date: 18 August 1976, 06:36 UTC
- Return launch: 19 August 1976, 05:25 UTC
- Landing site: 12.7145°N 62.2097°E, Mare Crisium
- Sample mass: 170.1 g (6.00 oz)

Instruments
- Stereo photographic imaging system Improved drill/Remote arm for sample collection Radiation detector Radio-altimeter

Luna 24 was a robotic probe of the Soviet Union's Luna programme. The 24th mission of the Luna series of spacecraft, the mission of the Luna 24 probe was the third Soviet mission to return lunar soil samples from the Moon (the first two sample return missions were Luna 16 and Luna 20). The probe landed in Mare Crisium (Sea of Crises). The mission returned 170.1 g (6.00 oz) of lunar samples to the Earth on 22 August 1976.

== Spacecraft ==
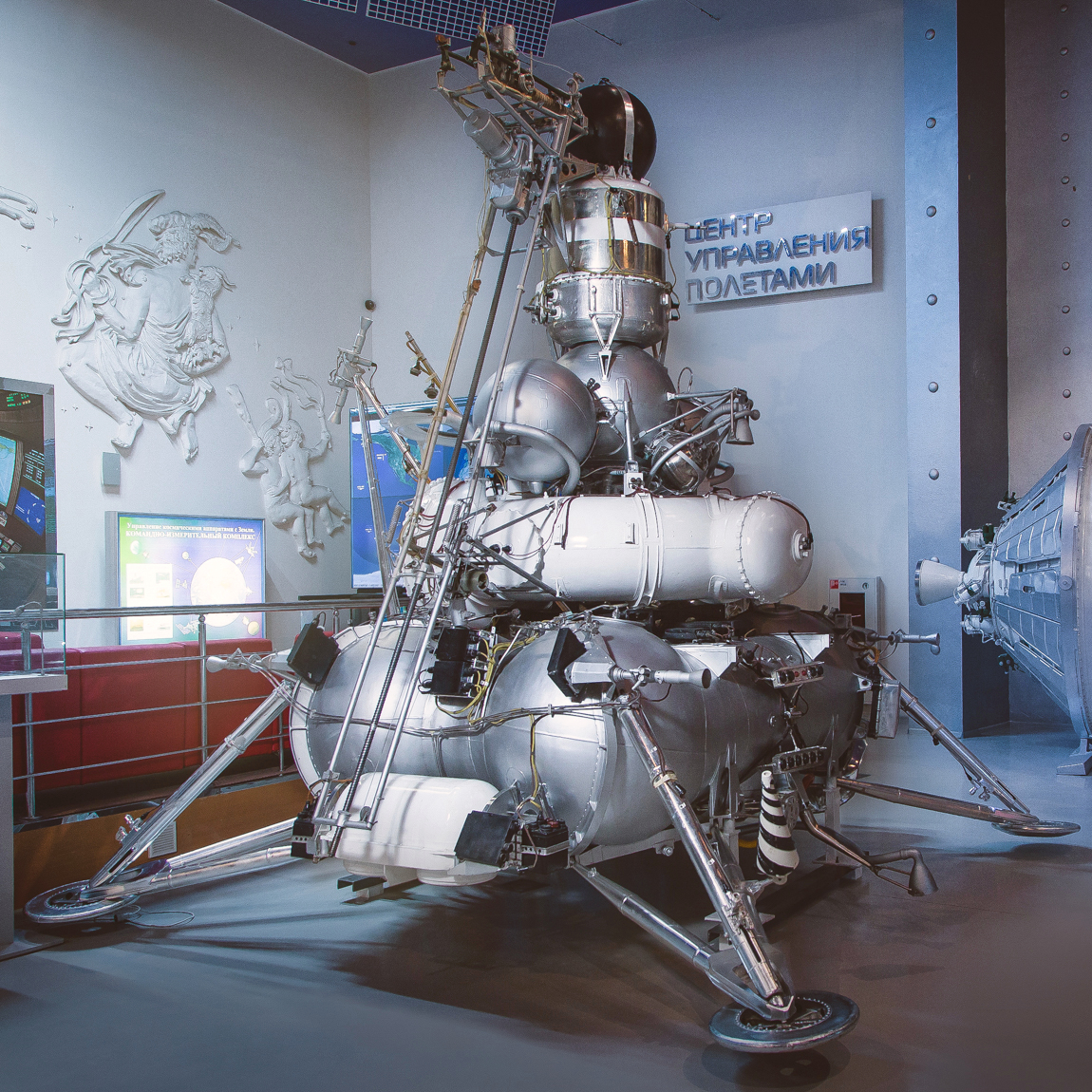
Model of ''Luna 24'' Moon lander

Luna 24 was based on the Ye-8-5 spacecraft body, consisting of two attached stages, an ascent stage mounted on top of a descent stage. The lander stood 3.96 meters tall and had an unfueled landed mass of 1880 kg. With a full load of fuel its launch mass was between 5600 and 5750 kg.

The descent stage was the same as the Ye-8 lower stage for the Lunokhod rovers, a cylindrical body with four protruding landing legs, fuel tanks, a landing radar altimeter, and a dual descent engine complex. The main descent rocket, the KTDU-417, was a throttleable 1920 kg thrust engine used for mid-course corrections, orbit insertion, braking for descent to the surface, and to slow the craft until it reached a cutoff point which was determined by the onboard computer based on altitude and velocity. After cutoff a bank of lower thrust (210 and 350 kg) vernier jets was used for the final landing. The descent stage also acted as a launch pad for the ascent stage. The spacecraft descent stage was equipped with a television camera, radiation and temperature monitors, telecommunications equipment, and a 90 cm extendable arm with a drilling rig for the collection of a lunar soil sample. Communications were via a conical antenna at the end of a boom at 768 and 922 MHz (downlink) and 115 MHz (uplink).

The ascent stage was a smaller cylinder with a spherical top which replaced the Lunokhod rover and housing from the Ye-8 bus. It carried a cylindrical hermetically sealed soil sample container inside a spherical re-entry capsule, mounted on a 1920 kg thrust KRD-61 rocket. Total mass of the ascent stage was 520 kg, of which 245 kg was the nitric acid and UDMH propellant. It was about 2 meters tall. The sample return cabin was 50 cm in diameter and had a mass of 39 kg. The KRD-61 could only fire once, for 53 seconds, to put it on a free return trajectory to Earth. Specific impulse of the engine was 313 seconds, it could impart a velocity of 2600–2700 m/s to the return craft.

== Mission ==
Lunar mission	Sample returned	Year
Luna 16	101 g	1970
Luna 20	30 g	1972
Luna 24	170.1 g	1976

Luna 24 was the third attempt to recover a sample from the unexplored Mare Crisium, the location of a large lunar mascon (after Luna 23 and a launch failure in October 1975). After a trajectory correction on 11 August 1976, Luna 24 entered lunar orbit three days later. Initial orbital parameters were 115 by 115 km (71 by 71 mi) at 120° inclination. After further changes to its orbit, Luna 24 set down safely on the lunar surface at 06:36 UTC on 18 August 1976 at 12°45' North latitude and 62°12' East longitude, not far from where Luna 23 had landed. Exact landing location (12.7145° N, 62.2097° E) was determined by the Lunar Reconnaissance Orbiter probe orbital cameras in 2012. The crater adjacent to the lander was subsequently named Lev by the IAU.

Under command from ground control, the lander deployed its sample arm and pushed its drilling head about two metres into the nearby soil. The sample was safely stowed in the small return capsule, and after nearly a day on the Moon, Luna 24 lifted off successfully at 05:25 UTC on 19 August 1976. After an uneventful return trip, Luna 24's capsule entered Earth's atmosphere and parachuted safely to land at 05:55 UTC on 22 August 1976, about 200 km (120 mi) southeast of Surgut in western Siberia. Study of the recovered 170.1 g (6.00 oz) of soil indicated a laminated type structure, as if laid down in successive deposits. The Soviet Union swapped a gram of the mission sample for a lunar sample from NASA in December 1976. Luna 24 was the final lunar spacecraft to be launched by the Soviet Union. It was also the last spacecraft to make a soft landing on the Moon until the landing of China's Chang'e 3 on 14 December 2013, 37 years later. For over 40 years, it was also the last Lunar sample return mission until China's Chang'e 5 in December 2020.

== Detection of water in returned samples ==
In February 1978, Soviet scientists M. Akhmanova, B. Dement'ev, and M. Markov of the Vernadsky Institute of Geochemistry and Analytic Chemistry published a paper claiming a detection of water fairly definitively. Their study showed that the samples returned to Earth by the probe contained about 0.1% water by mass, as seen in infrared absorption spectroscopy (at about 3 μm wavelength), at a detection level about 10 times above the threshold, although Crotts points out that "The authors... were not willing to stake their reputations on an absolute statement that terrestrial contamination was completely avoided." This would represent the first detection of water content on the surface of the moon, although that result has not been confirmed by other researchers.

== See also ==
- Timeline of artificial satellites and space probes
- List of artificial objects on the Moon (descent stage)
- List of missions to the Moon
