= Luna 16 =

Soviet space probe

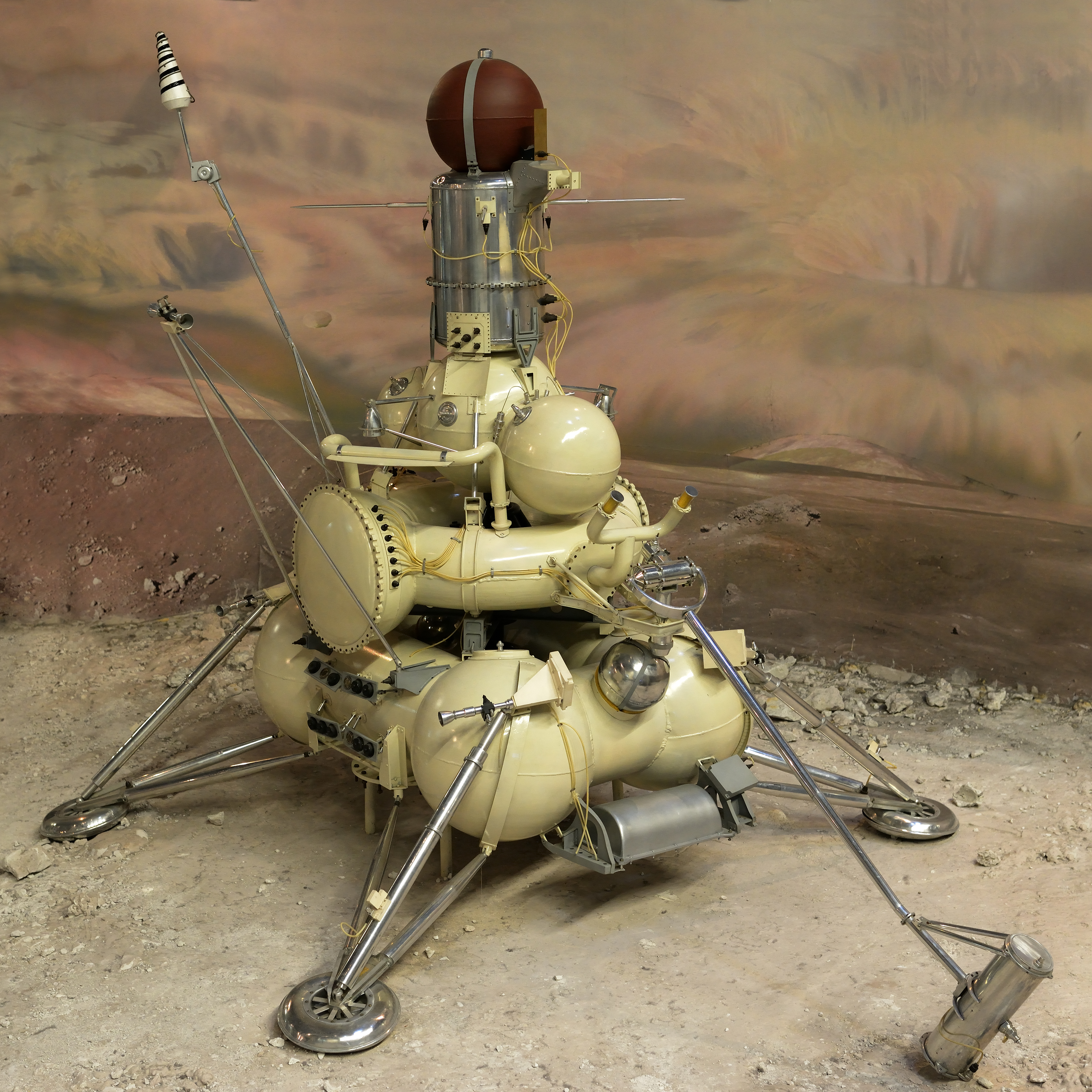
- Luna 16 replica
- Mission type: Lunar sample return
- Operator: Soviet space program
- COSPAR ID: 1970-072A
- SATCAT no.: 4527
- Mission duration: 12 days

Spacecraft properties
- Bus: Ye-8-5
- Manufacturer: GSMZ Lavochkin
- Launch mass: 5,725 kg (12,621 lb)
- Landing mass: 1,880 kg (4,140 lb)

Start of mission
- Launch date: 12 September 1970, 13:25:52 UTC
- Rocket: Proton-K/D
- Launch site: Baikonur 81/23

End of mission
- Landing date: 24 September 1970, 05:25 UTC
- Landing site: 47°24′N 68°36′E

Orbital parameters
- Reference system: Selenocentric
- Semi-major axis: 6,488.8 km (4,032.0 mi)
- Eccentricity: 0
- Periselene altitude: 111 km (69 mi)
- Aposelene altitude: 111 km (69 mi)
- Inclination: 70°
- Period: 119 minutes
- Epoch: 18 September 1970

Lunar orbiter
- Orbital insertion: 17 September 1970
- Orbits: ~36

Lunar lander
- Landing date: 20 September 1970, 05:18 UTC
- Return launch: 21 September 1970, 07:43 UTC
- Landing site: 0.5137°S 56.3638°E
- Sample mass: 101 grams (3.6 oz)

Instruments
- Stereo photographic imaging system Remote arm for sample collection Radiation detector

Luna 16 was an uncrewed 1970 space mission, part of the Soviet Luna program. It was the first robotic probe to land on the Moon and return a sample of lunar soil to Earth. The 101 grams (3.56 ounces) sample was returned from Mare Fecunditatis. It represented the first successful lunar sample return mission by the Soviet Union and was the third lunar sample return mission overall.

== Overview ==
The spacecraft consisted of two attached stages, an ascent stage mounted on top of a descent stage. The descent stage was a cylindrical body with four protruding landing legs, fuel tanks, a landing radar, and a dual descent-engine complex.

A main descent engine was used to slow the craft until it reached a cutoff point, which was determined by the on-board computer based on altitude and velocity. After cutoff a bank of lower-thrust jets was used for the final landing. The descent stage also acted as a launch pad for the ascent stage.

The ascent stage was a smaller cylinder with a rounded top. It carried a cylindrical hermetically sealed soil-sample container inside a re-entry capsule.

The spacecraft descent stage was equipped with a television camera, radiation and temperature monitors, telecommunications equipment, and an extendable arm with a drilling rig for the collection of a lunar soil sample.

== Mission summary ==
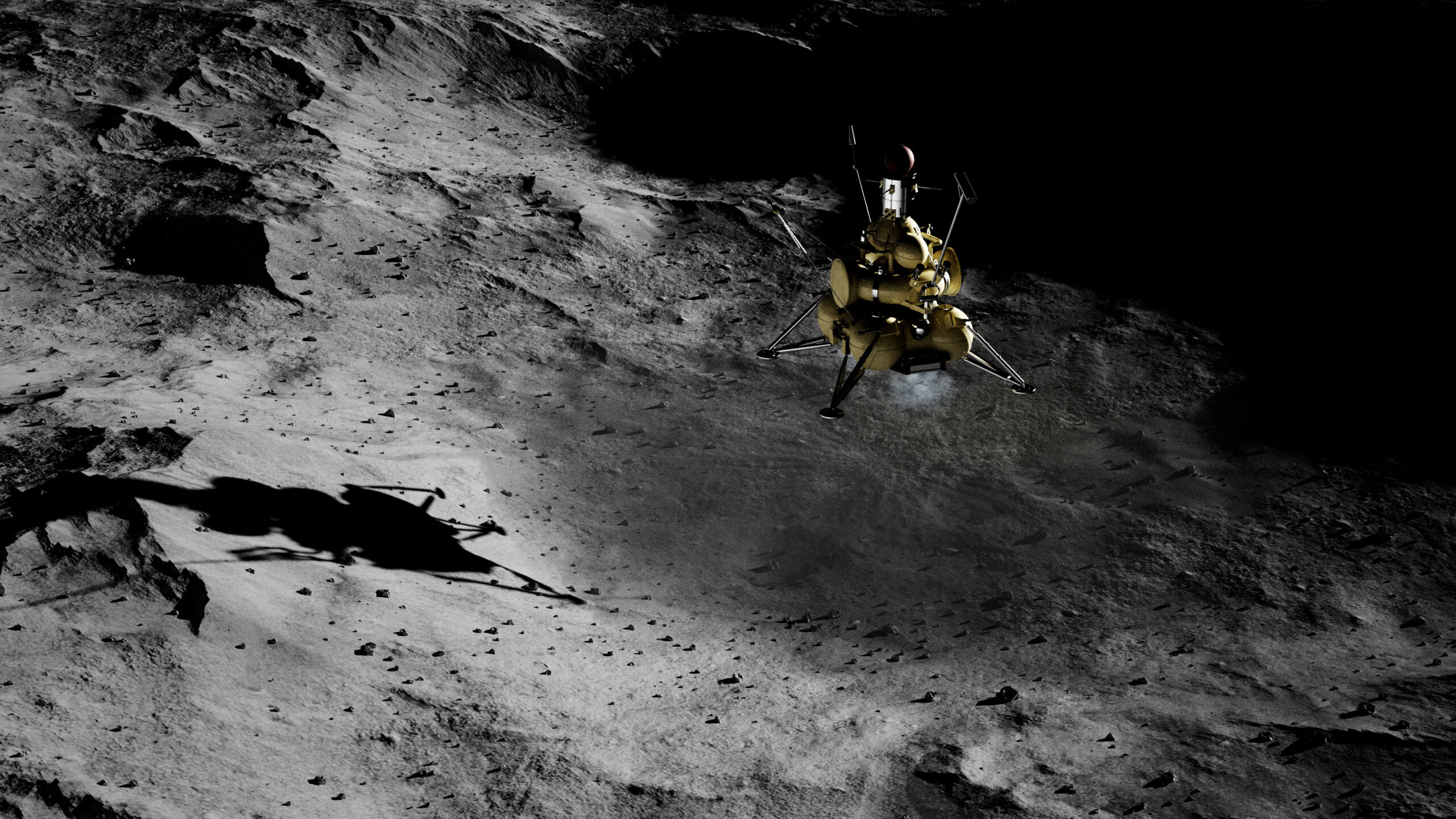
Artist's impression of Luna 16 landing on the Moon

The Luna 16 automated station was launched toward the Moon from a preliminary Earth orbit and after one mid-course correction on 13 September it entered a circular 111 km with 70° inclination lunar orbit on 17 September 1970. The lunar gravity was studied from this orbit. After two orbital adjustments were performed on 18 and 19 September the perilune was decreased to 15.1 km, as well as the inclination altered in preparation for landing. At perilune at 05:12 UTC on 20 September, the main braking engine was fired, initiating the descent to the lunar surface. Six minutes later, at 05:18 UT, the spacecraft safely soft-landed in its target area at 0°41' south latitude and 56°18' east longitude, in the northeast area of Mare Fecunditatis (Sea of Fertility) approximately 100 kilometers west of Webb crater and 150 km north of Langrenus crater.

This was the first landing made in lunar night, as the Sun had set about 60 hours earlier. The main descent engine cut off at an altitude of 20 m, and the landing jets cut off at 2 m height at a velocity less than 2.4 m/s, followed by vertical free fall. The mass of the spacecraft at landing was 1,880 kilograms. Less than an hour after landing, at 06:03 UT, an automatic drill penetrated the lunar surface to collect a soil sample. After drilling for seven minutes, the drill reached a stop at 35 centimeters depth and then withdrew its sample and lifted it in an arc to the top of the spacecraft, depositing the lunar material in a small spherical capsule mounted on the main spacecraft bus. The column of regolith in the drill tube was then transferred to the soil sample container.

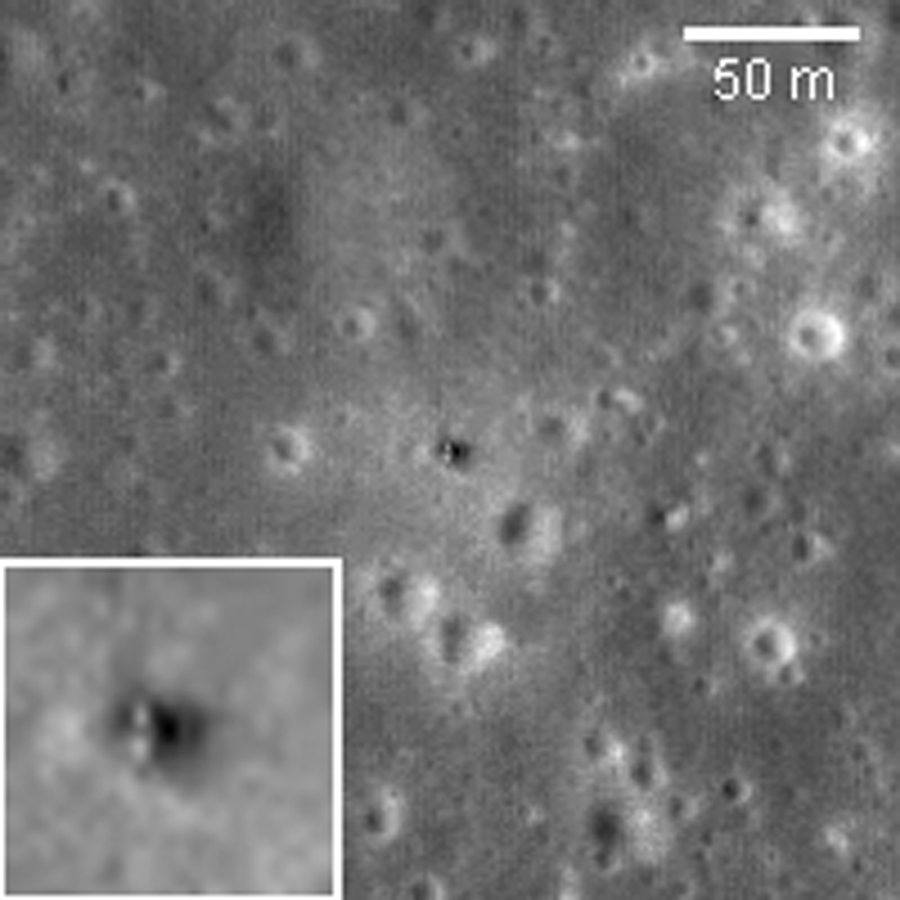
Luna 16 descent stage as seen from orbit by Lunar Reconnaissance orbiter 2 September 2009

After 26 hours and 25 minutes on the lunar surface, at 07:43 UT on 21 September, the spacecraft's upper stage lifted off from the Moon. The lower stage of Luna 16 remained on the lunar surface and continued transmission of lunar temperature and radiation data. Three days later, on 24 September, after a direct ascent traverse with no mid-course corrections, the capsule, with its 101 grams of lunar soil, reentered Earth's atmosphere at a velocity of 11 kilometers per second. The capsule parachuted down 80 kilometers southeast of the town of Jezkazgan in Kazakhstan at 05:25 UT on 24 September 1970. Analysis of the dark basalt material indicated a close resemblance to soil recovered by the American Apollo 12 mission.

According to the Bochum Observatory in Germany, strong and good-quality television pictures were returned by the spacecraft. Luna 16 was a landmark success for the Soviets in their deep-space exploration program; the mission accomplished the first fully automatic recovery of soil samples from the surface of an extraterrestrial body.

On 10 June 1971, the Soviet Academy of Sciences exchanged Luna 16 samples with NASA in Moscow, receiving samples from Apollo 11 and Apollo 12.

A 0.4825 g sample of material from a depth of 27 cm was sent to Britain.

== Legacy ==
Lunar Mission	Sample Returned	Year
Luna 16	101 g (3.6 oz)	1970
Luna 20	30 g (1.1 oz)	1972
Luna 24	170 g (6.0 oz)	1976

Three tiny samples (0.2 grams) of the Luna 16 soil were sold at Sotheby's auction for $442,500 in 1993. The samples were resold by Sotheby's for US$855,000 on 29 November 2018.

A series of 10-kopeck stamps was issued in 1970 to commemorate the flight of Luna 16 lunar probe and depicted the main stages of the programme: soft landing on Moon, launch of the lunar soil sample return capsule, and parachute assisted landing back on Earth.

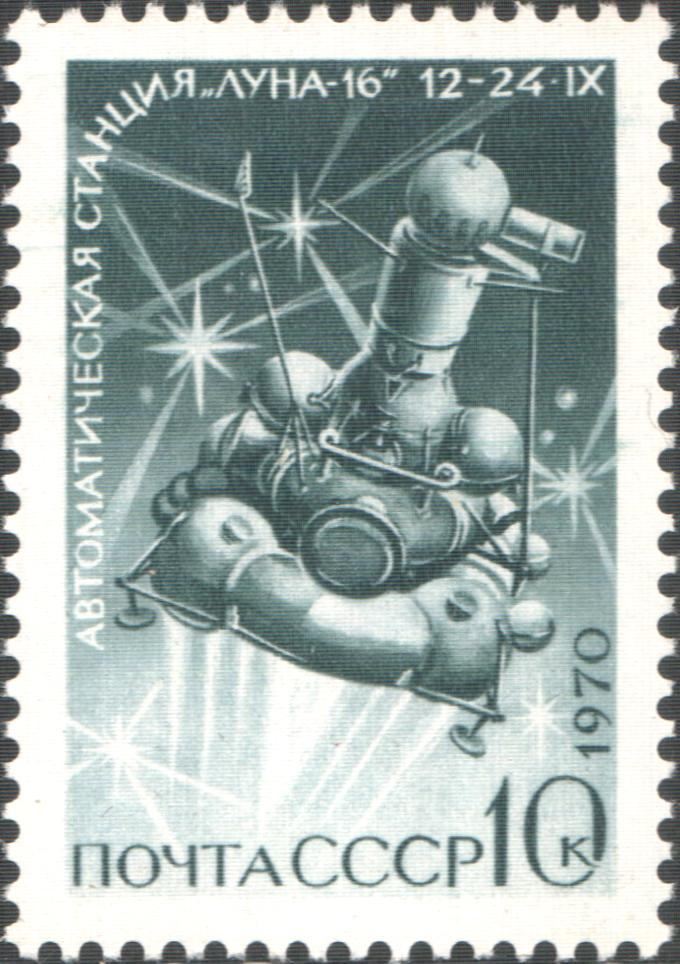
Stamp depicting the soft landing on Moon

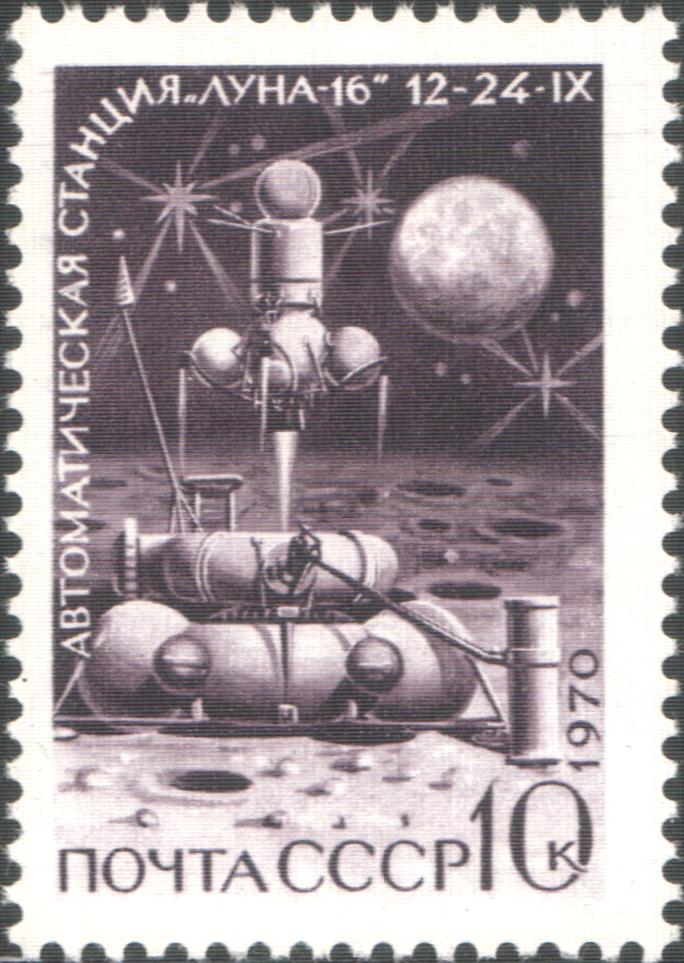
Stamp depicting the launch of the lunar soil sample return capsule

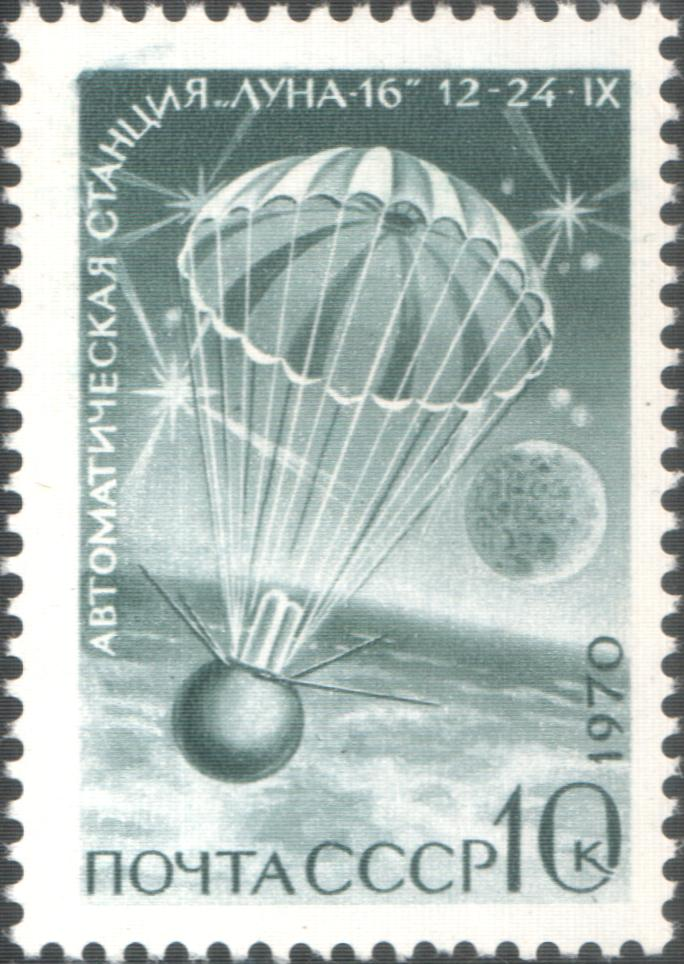
Stamp depicting the parachute assisted landing back on Earth

Replicas of Luna 16 are on display at the Memorial Museum of Cosmonautics and Tsiolkovsky State Museum of the History of Cosmonautics.

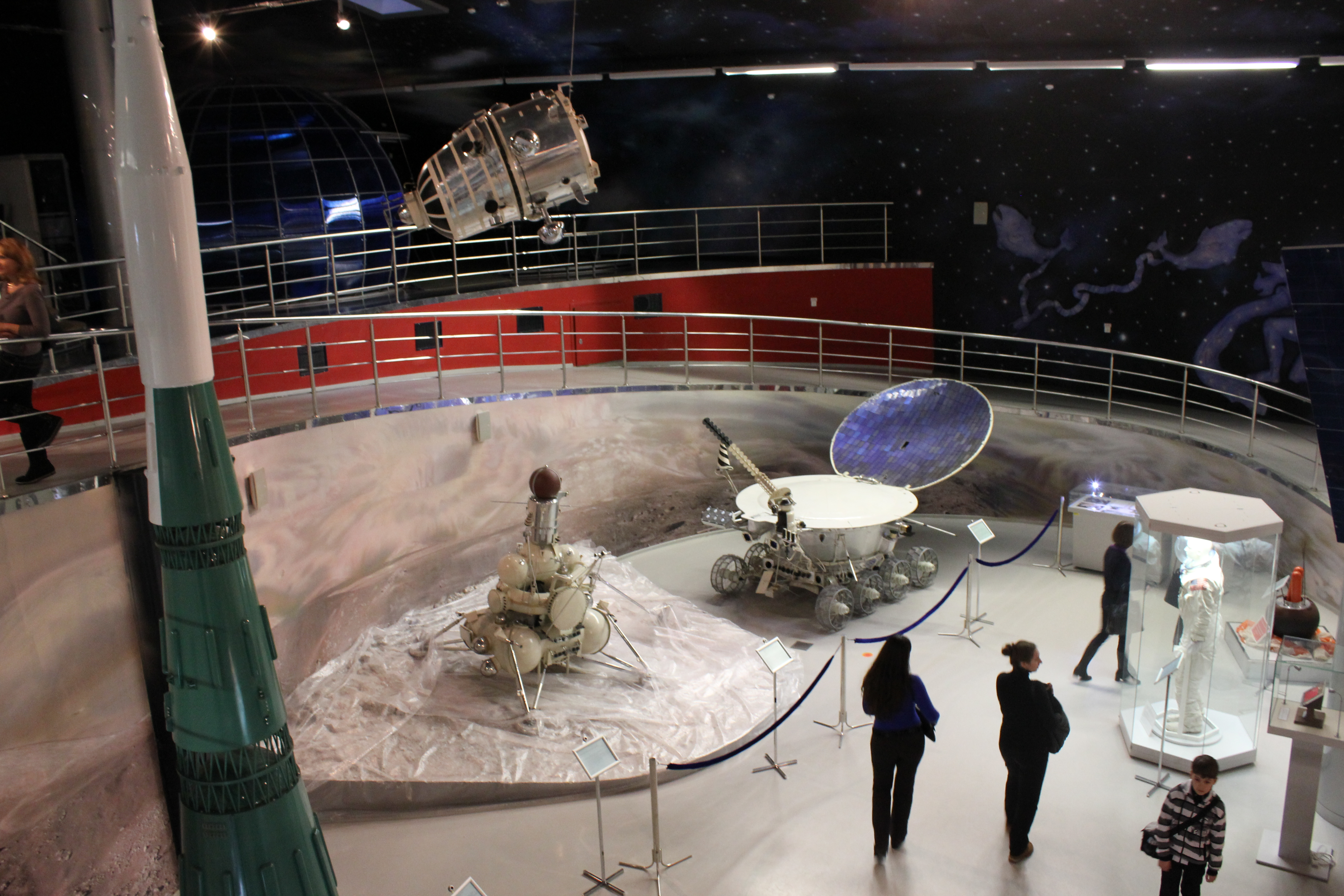
Luna 16 replica at the Memorial Museum of Cosmonautics

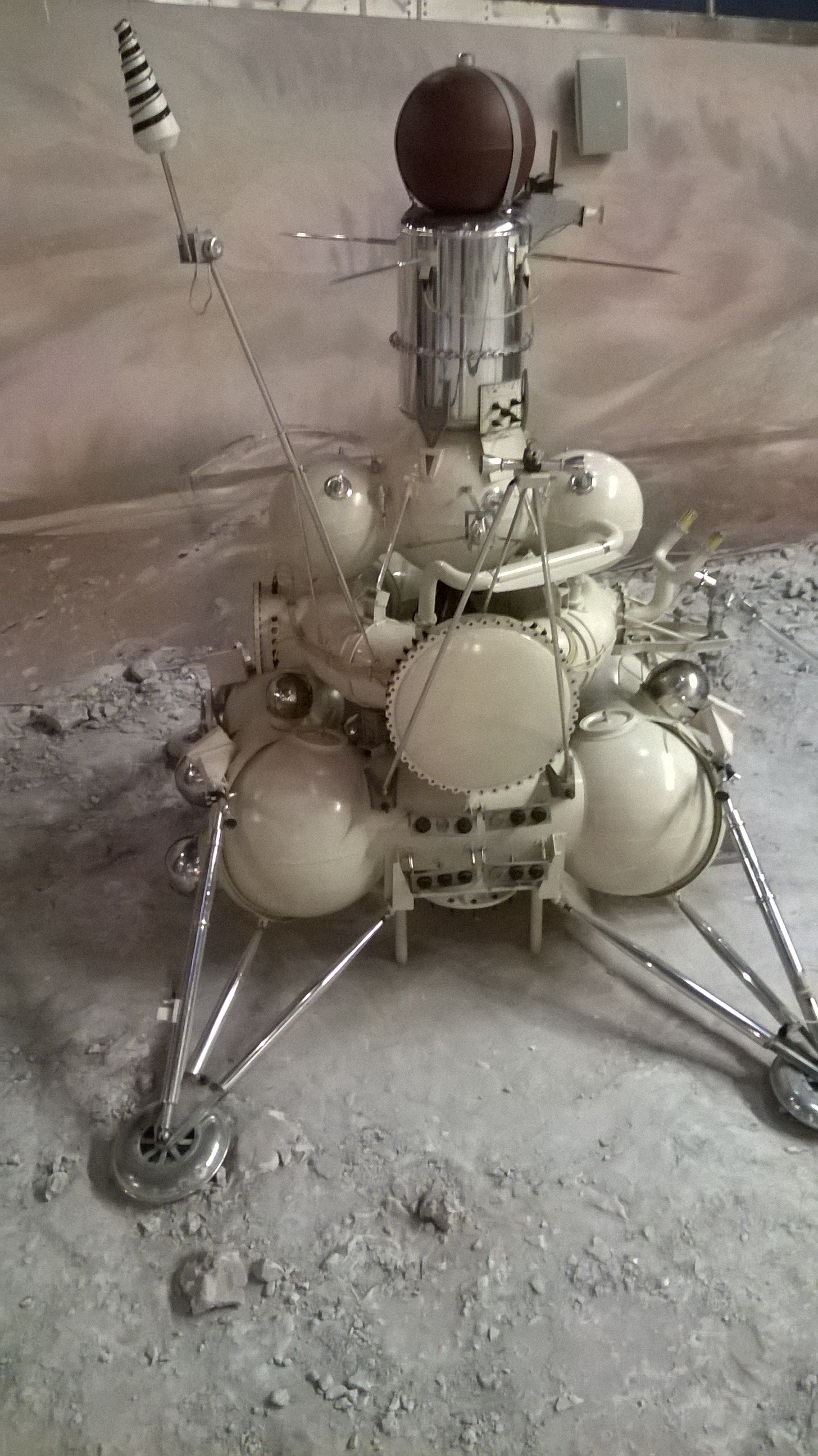
Luna 16 replica at the Memorial Museum of Cosmonautics

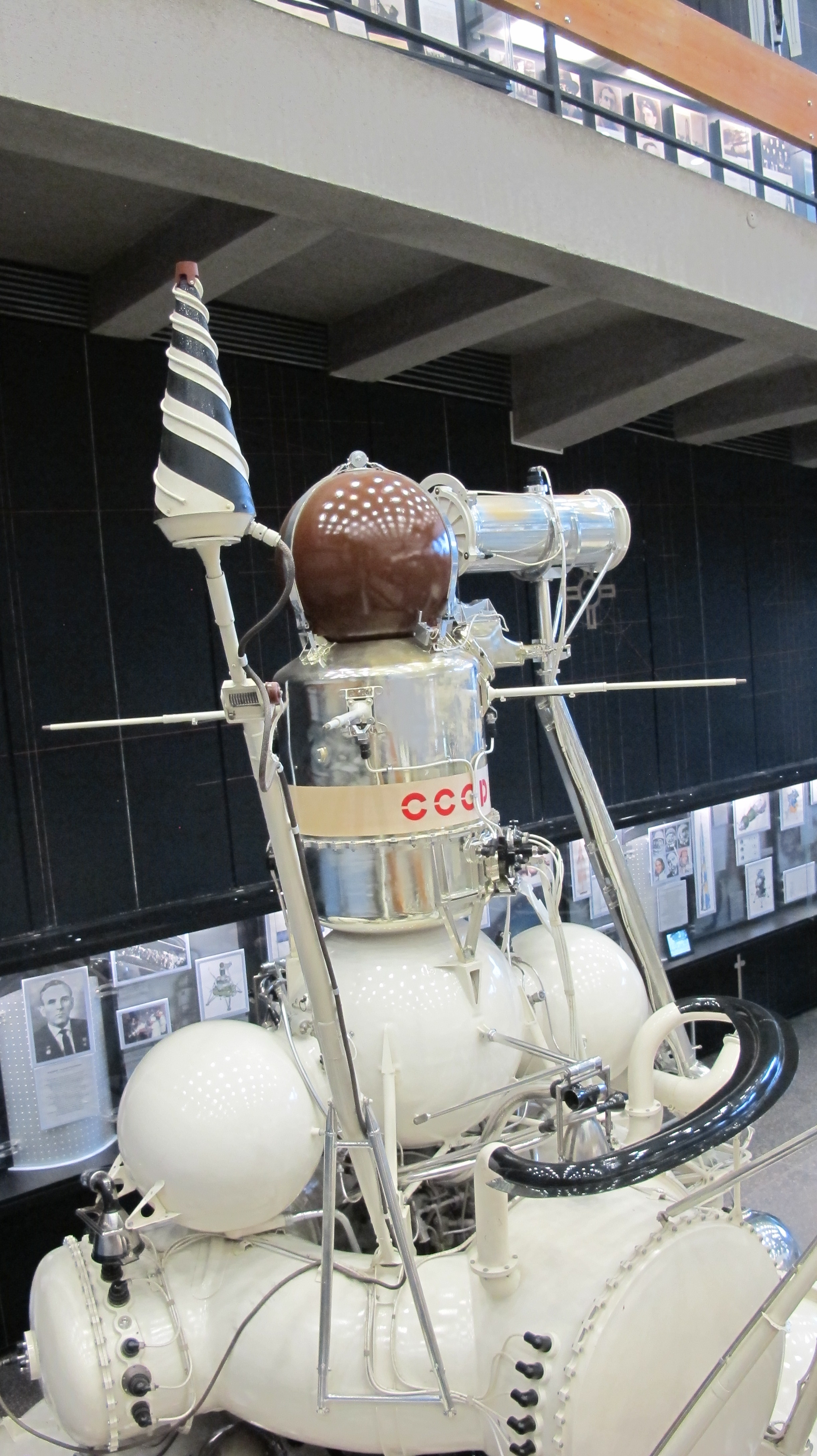
Luna 16 replica at the Tsiolkovsky State Museum of the History of Cosmonautics

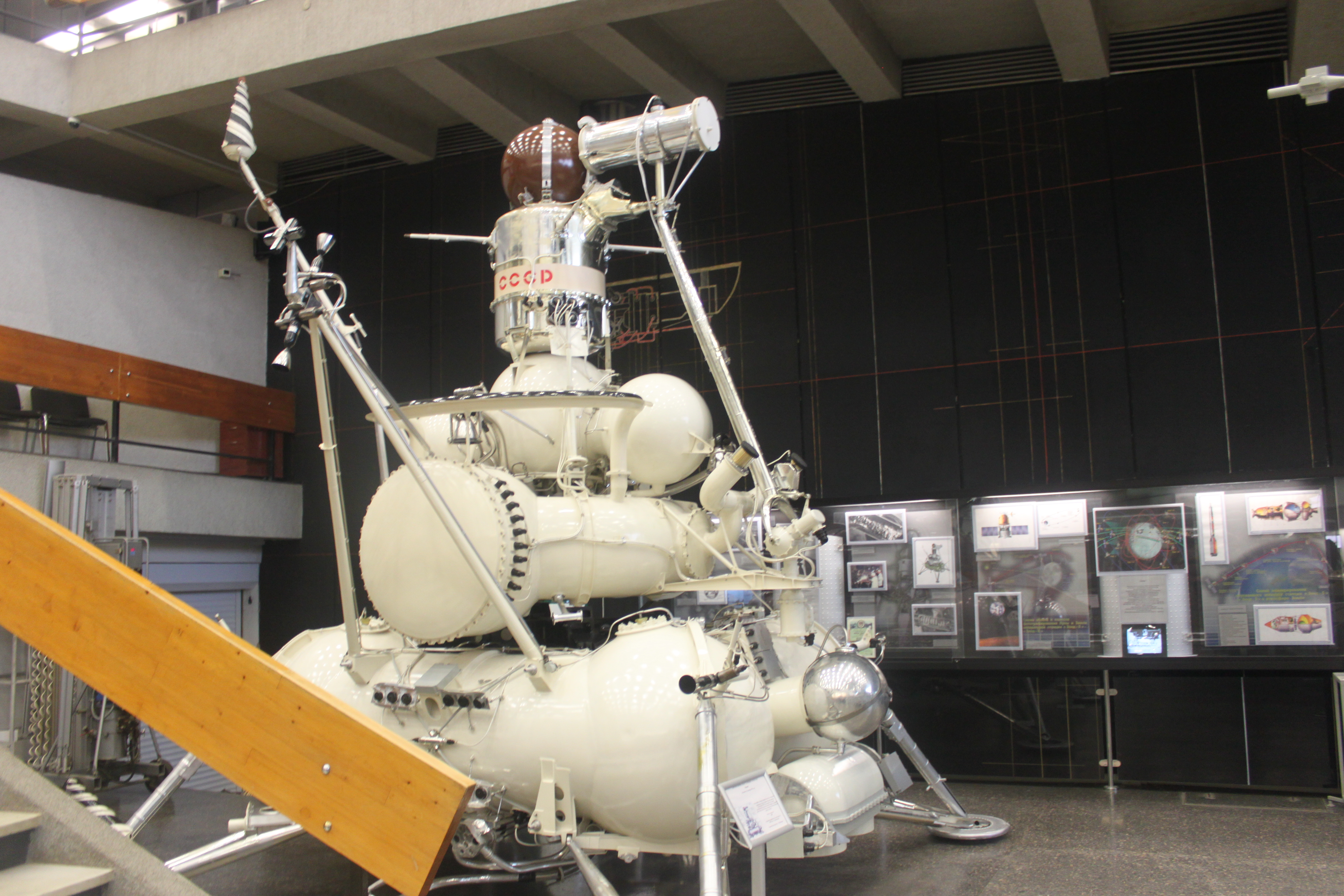
Luna 16 replica at the Tsiolkovsky State Museum of the History of Cosmonautics

== See also ==
- Timeline of artificial satellites and space probes
- List of artificial objects on the Moon (descent stage)
- List of missions to the Moon
