= Gudkov Gu-82 =

Soviet fighter prototype

Gu-82

General information
- Type: Fighter
- National origin: USSR
- Manufacturer: Gudkov OKB
- Designer: Mikhail Gudkov
- Number built: 1 (second prototype not completed)

History
- First flight: 11 September 1942
- Developed from: Lavochkin-Gorbunov-Gudkov LaGG-3

The Gudkov Gu-82 (in Cyrillic characters Гудков Гу-82) was a single-engine low-wing fighter developed by Mikhail Gudkov in the Soviet Union in the 1940s. A radial engined variant of the Lavochkin-Gorbunov-Gudkov LaGG-3, the Gu-82 was intended to alleviate the performance shortcomings of its predecessor already employed by Voyenno-Vozdushnye Sily (VVS) in the initial phases of World War II.

== Design and development ==
=== Background ===
In 1939 the Soviet government believed that it was necessary to modernize the VVS, which had been using the radial engine Polikarpov I-16 and I-153. They issued a specification for a new generation of aircraft, characterized by higher overall performance, equipped with high-powered liquid cooled V-12 engines.

Four OKBs presented proposals, three of which were approved and launched for series production, the Yakovlev Yak-1, Lavochkin-Gorbunov-Gudkov I-22, and Mikoyan-Gurevich MiG-1.

The I-22, later redesignated LaGG-1, was found to be unsuitable and in need of technical improvements, but was nevertheless ordered to be developed, as it was almost entirely made of non-strategic materials, although only 100 were built. Even the LaGG-1s successor, the LaGG-3, continued to suffer from a series of problems that were reflected in the overall performance of the aircraft in combat, mainly related to the maximum speed, which on production aircraft was 40 km/h (25 mph; 22 kn) lower than the prototypes tested by the VVS.

The lack of confidence in the potential of the aircraft by the pilots was summarized in the nickname they assigned: the initials LaGG, identifying designers Lavočkin, Gorbunov, and Gudkov became lakirovanny garantirovanny grob ("guaranteed painted casket").

=== Development ===
Mihail Ivanovich Gudkov, who together with Semyon Lavochkin and Vladimir Petrovich Gorbunov had collaborated on the design of the aircraft, believed that a quick remedy to the shortcomings of the LaGG-3 was a new engine, the Shvetsov ASh-82 (also known as M-82) radial. The new unit developed more power than the Klimov M-105 in the LaGG-1/3; moreover, at the expense of a slightly higher frontal area, it enjoyed the advantage of continuing to operate in the event of one of the cylinders being shot out.

On 25 August 1941, Gudkov was allocated an engine and began installation into an LaGG-3, so increasing the offensive firepower by installing 2x 12.7 mm (0.500 in) Berezin UB machine-guns and 2x 20 mm (0.787 in) ShVAK cannon.

The aircraft, given the official designation Gu-82, was flown successfully on 11 September 1942, when it was found that the maximum speed, attested to 573 km/h (356 mph; 309 kn), was slightly higher than its predecessor, the agility was also significantly increased. Gudkov presented the results to Stalin and advocated the establishment of a new production line, news that was greeted with enthusiasm by the pilots who had the hope of having an aircraft more suitable to fight against the Luftwaffe. However, Lavochkin had developed another variant of the LaGG-3 with a radial engine, the Lavochkin La-5, which proved to be far superior, thus the development of the Gu-82 was cancelled.

== Specifications (Gu-82) ==
Data from

General characteristics

- Crew: 1
- Length: 8.75 m (28 ft 8 in)
- Wingspan: 9.8 m (32 ft 2 in)
- Wing area: 17.51 m^{2} (188.5 sq ft)
- Powerplant: 1 × Shvetsov ASh-82 , 990 kW (1,330 hp)
- Propellers: 3-bladed constant-speed propeller

Performance Armament

- Guns: *2x 12.7 mm (0.500 in) Berezin UB machine-guns
- 2x 20 mm (0.787 in) ShVAK cannon
