= Lavochkin-Gorbunov-Gudkov LaGG-3 =

1940 Soviet fighter aircraft

LaGG-3
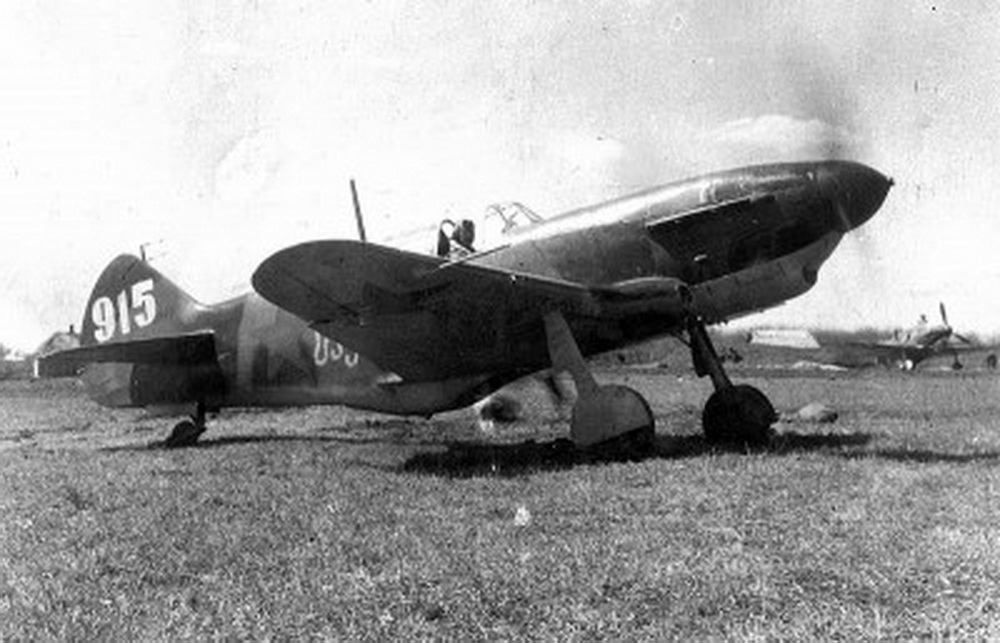
- A LaGG-3 before take off

General information
- Type: Fighter
- National origin: Soviet Union
- Designer: Lavochkin-Gorbunov-Gudkov V. P. Gorbunov (Designer)
- Built by: 21 (Gorky), 31 (Taganrog/Tbilisi), 23/153 (Leningrad/Novosibirsk)
- Primary user: Soviet Union
- Number built: 6,528

History
- Manufactured: 1941–1944
- Introduction date: early 1941
- First flight: 28 March 1940
- Retired: 1944
- Developed from: LaGG-1
- Developed into: Lavochkin La-5

The Lavochkin-Gorbunov-Gudkov LaGG-3 (Лавочкин-Горбунов-Гудков ЛаГГ-3) was a Soviet fighter aircraft of World War II. It was a refinement of the earlier LaGG-1 and was one of the most modern aircraft available to the Soviet Air Forces at the time of Germany's invasion in 1941. Compared to its opponents the LaGG-3 was underpowered and, despite its wooden construction, overweight. It was unpopular with Soviet pilots, but despite this, at one point in the war, on average 12 LaGG-3s were being completed daily and 6,528 had been built in total when production switched to the Yak-3 in 1944. The LaGG-3 was steadily improved, forming the basis for the more successful La-5 and La-7.

== Design and development ==
The prototype of the LaGG-3 was called the I-301 and was designed by Semyon A. Lavochkin, Vladimir P. Gorbunov and Mikhail I. Gudkov. The prototype was later renamed the LaGG-1 and production aircraft were called the LaGG-3. The prototype was designed and produced by the GAZ-301 factory in Khimki to the North West of Moscow. The design was approved for production in January 1940 and in the prototype's name the I- prefix stood for istrebitel (Russian: истребитель, lit. 'fighter') and the number signified the design bureau responsible (which in this case was the GAZ-301 factory). The I-301 was a single-seat, low-wing monoplane, with a semi-monocoque fuselage, and skinned with birch veneer and plywood.

The I-301 airframe was partially made of "delta wood": a material composed of very thin (0.35–0.55 mm) layers of birch or pine wood veneer, and a phenol-formaldehyde resin known as VIAM-B-3, which together were baked at high temperatures and pressures. Delta wood was used for critical parts of the airframe. This novel construction material had tensile strength comparable to that of non-hardened aluminum alloys and only 30% lower than that of precipitation hardened D-1A grade duralumin. It was also incombustible and completely invulnerable to rot, with service life measured in decades in adverse conditions. During production of the prototype, it was discovered that the adhesive used in delta wood caused skin irritation and safety procedures needed to be devised for workers.

The full wooden wing (with plywood surfaces) was analogous to that of the Yak-1. The only difference was that the LaGG's wings were built from two spars. The fuselage was of similar construction to the MiG-1.

The I-301 was armed with one axial mounted MP-6 23 mm autocannon designed by Yakov Taubin which fired through a hollow propeller shaft in the "vee" between the engine cylinders and two synchronized 12.7 mm (0.50 in) Berezin UBS machine guns in the cowl. The MP-6 had 81 rounds of ammunition while the Berezin UBS had 230 rounds per gun. The MP-6 was abandoned after the prototype due to excessive recoil forces that damaged engine fittings. The I-301 used a Klimov M-105P engine of 780 kW (1,050 hp) a licensed derivative of the Hispano-Suiza HS 12Y with a two-speed two-stage supercharger. At 6,543 lb (2,968 kg) it was heavier than its competitors the Yak-1 and MiG-1, which meant its ceiling of 9,800 m (32,000 ft) was less than both. The I-301 took to the air for the first time on 30 March 1940 and by 12 June 1940 the manufacturer's tests were completed. The test pilot, A. Nikashin, reported that the fit and finish of the prototype was very good, it handled well, was maneuverable, and could be mastered by pilots of average ability.

On 14 June 1940 state acceptance trials began and it reached 510 km/h (320 mph) at sea level, 584 km/h (363 mph) at 4,700 m (15,400 ft), and climbed to 5,000 m (16,400 ft) in 5.85 minutes. Later, the I-301 reached 604 km/h (375 mph) at 4,950 m (16,250 ft) with its radiator doors shut making it the fastest M-105P powered aircraft. The I-301 had a fuel capacity of 340 L (90 US gal) carried in three self-sealing fuel tanks between the wing spars in the wing's center-section giving it a range of 600 km (373 mi). During testing the state specification was increased to a maximum range of 1,000 km (620 mi) and fuel capacity was increased to 450 L (119 US gal). Aircraft with this fuel capacity were designated as LaGG-3's while the prototype was re-designated as the LaGG-1. The test flights revealed 114 faults that needed to be fixed but the project was given high priority so most of these faults were to be addressed in production aircraft.

== Operational history ==
On 29 June 1940 the LaGG-3 was accepted for production. The first plant to build LaGG-3's was Plant No.23 in Leningrad and was tested in December 1940. As soon they were built, the first aircraft were sent to their units in Soviet Asia. The LaGG-3 proved immensely unpopular with pilots. It was somewhat hard to control as it reacted sluggishly to stick forces. In particular, it was difficult to pull out of a dive, and if the stick was pulled too hard it tended to fall into a spin. As a consequence, sharp turns were difficult to perform. Moreover, pilots reported several imperfections: badly made hydraulic systems, broken connecting rods, oil leaks, engine overheating, rapid engine wear and loss of power. Other faults included defective landing gear, tail wheel failure, poor quality cockpit glass, poorly finished cowling panels, and poor quality delta wood panels due to rushed production as a result of the German invasion. The quality of aircraft varied widely from factory to factory.

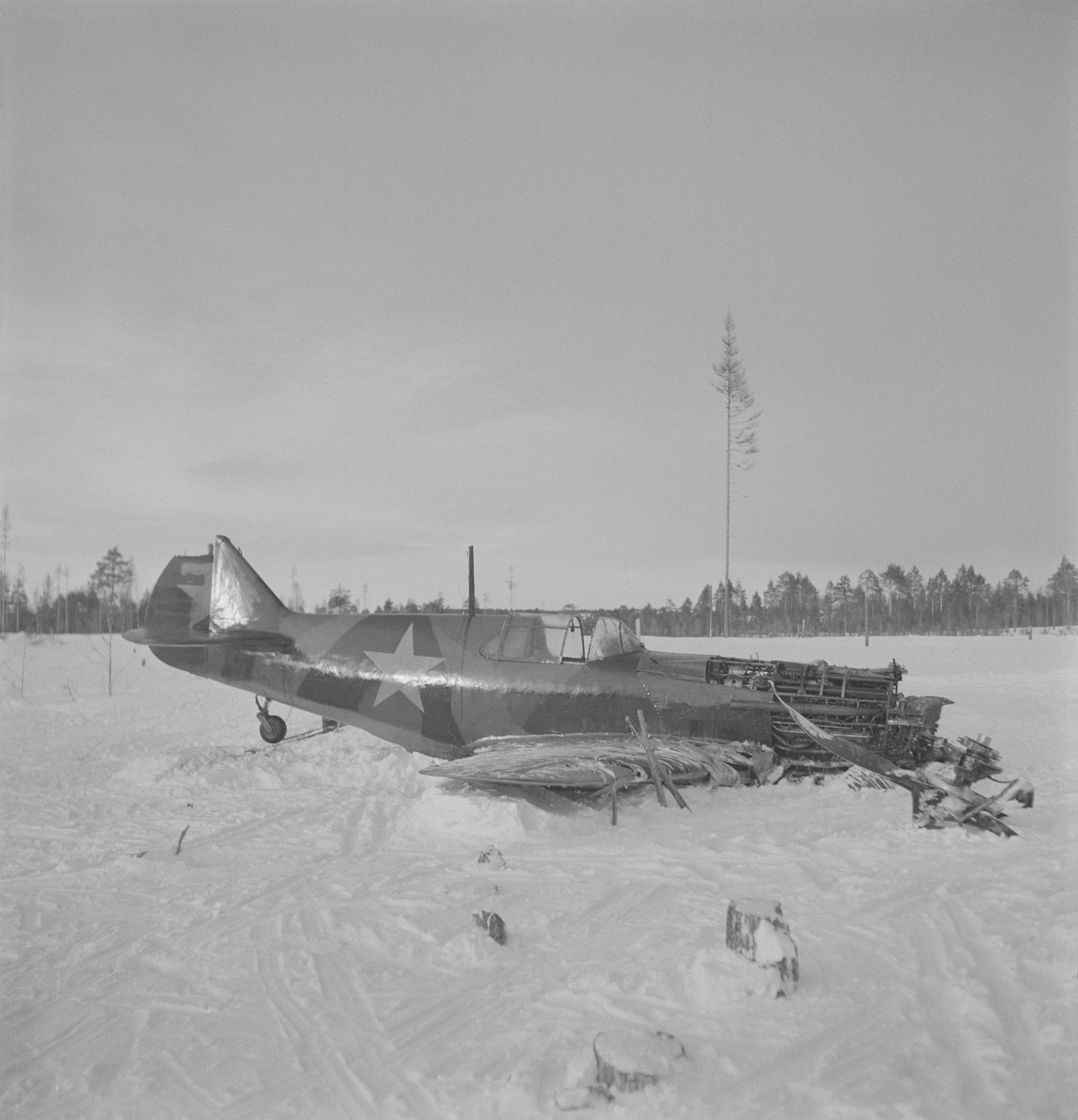
A Soviet LaGG-3 shot down by Finnish air defenses, 1942.

As reports of these problems came back to Lavochkin's Experimental Design Bureau (OKB) in February 1941 no less than 2,228 modifications were ordered to be introduced into the series. Actually, despite the military's doubts, the Soviet government ordered 66 series of the Lavochkin fighter, which underwent a host of successive improvements in engines, propeller, and armament. The airframe was lightened as well. The LaGG team re-examined the design and pared down the structure as much as possible. Moreover, automatic slats were added to the wings to improve climb and maneuverability on the 35th Series and further weight was saved by installing lighter armament. The first four series were equipped with one axial Berezin machine gun firing through a hollow propeller shaft, two more synchronized cowl mounted Berezin machine guns with 200 rounds per gun and two synchronized 7.62 mm (0.3 in) ShKAS machine guns above and to the rear of the cowling with 325 rounds per gun; from 8th Series the axial Berezin was replaced by a 20 mm (0.79 in) ShVAK, coupled with a port Berezin in the cowling. But the improvement was slight and, thus, without an alternative powerplant, when the LaGG-3 was first committed to combat in July 1941, it was effective against bombers but it was completely outclassed by the Messerschmitt Bf 109 F.

In combat, the main advantage of the LaGG-3 was the strength of its airframe and the fact that it did not easily catch fire, despite the extensive use of wood. However, the laminated wooden panels did tend to shatter when hit by high explosive rounds and Soviet pilots nicknamed the plane Lakirovanny Garantirovanny Grob (Russian: Лакированный Гарантированный Гроб), or "guaranteed varnished coffin".

On the whole, pilots disliked the type. Pilot Viktor M. Sinaisky recalled:

It was an unpleasant customer! Preparing the LaGG-3 for flight demanded more time in comparison with other planes. All cylinders were ... to be synchronized: God forbid you should change the gas distribution! We were strictly forbidden to touch the engine ... [T]here were constant problems with [the] water-cooled engines in winter... [T]here was no anti-freeze liquid [and y]ou couldn't keep the engine running all night long, so you had to pour hot water into the cooling system ... in the morning. ... [P]ilots didn't like flying the LaGG-3 – a heavy beast with a weak ... engine... [T]hey got used to it ... [but] we had higher losses on LaGG-3 than on I-16s.

Later in 1941, the LaGG-3 appeared with an internally balanced rudder, retractable ski landing gear for the winter, retractable tailwheel and plumbed for drop tanks. The result was still not good enough. Even with the lighter airframe and revised supercharged engine, the LaGG-3 was underpowered. However, despite its limitations, some Soviet pilots managed to reach the status of ace flying the LaGG-3. G. I. Grigor'yev, from 178th IAP, was credited of at least 11 air victories plus two shared. But pictures of his LaGG-3 "Yellow 6", in November–December 1941, show 15 "stars", so his score was probably higher. Experiments with fitting a Shvetsov M-82 radial engine to the LaGG-3 airframe finally solved the power problem and led to the Lavochkin La-5 and La-7.

== Variants ==
=== Series production ===
1st Series
Production of the 1st Series progressed slowly and there were teething problems with the aircraft due to an untrained workforce with no aircraft manufacturing experience, unfamiliarity with the delta wood structure, incomplete technical drawings, a lack of jigs, and some factories hadn't fully converted from producing the Polikarpov I-16 and I-153 to the LaGG-3. Production LaGG-3's differed from the prototype by having strengthened landing gear, 10 mm (0.39 in) seat armor, enlarged carburetor air intake, and were armed with three Berezin UBS and two ShKAS machine guns. The 1st Series also had a 5-channel RSI-3 transmitter/receiver and antenna which was normally fitted to only flight leader aircraft while other aircraft in the flight only had receivers or no radio. Mass balance weights were added above and below the rudder to eliminate control surface flutter. In addition to three self-sealing fuel tanks the LaGG-3 had a unique fire suppression system which collected exhaust via a tube on the port side of the exhaust manifold that ran to a condenser where the gasses were cooled and pumped into the empty fuel tanks. The 1st Series used the Klimov M-105P engine of 820 kW (1,100 hp) with a centrifugal two-speed two-stage supercharger. Due to the addition of equipment the 1st Series was heavier than the prototype which negatively affected wing loading, rate of climb, ceiling, and maneuverability. As a result, the LaGG-3 was slow: its top speed was just 549 km/h (341 mph) at 5,000 m (16,500 ft) which was 55 km/h (34 mph) slower than the prototype's 604 km/h (375 mph) while climb to that altitude was 8.6 minutes instead of 5.85 for the prototype. Its rate of climb at ground level was as slow as 8.5 m/s (28 ft/s). The take-off run was at least 500 m (1,600 ft), compared to 355 m (1,165 ft) for the prototype because flaps could not be used due to the propeller speed governor which could not exceed 2,400 rpm instead of the engine's rated 2,700 rpm. Neither of the LaGG-3's competitors experienced as dramatic a performance decrease between prototype and production aircraft.

| Aircraft | Prototype | Production |
|---|---|---|
| I-200/MiG-3 | 630 km/h (390 mph) | 615 km/h (382 mph) |
| I-26/Yak-1 | 586 km/h (364 mph) | 560 km/h (348 mph) |
| I-301/LaGG-3 | 604 km/h (375 mph) | 549 km/h (341 mph) |

4th Series
The 4th Series of fighters incorporated several changes such as replacing the Berezin machine gun firing through the propeller hub with a ShVAK 20 mm with 120 rounds, deletion of the starboard cowl mounted Berezin machine gun, taller antenna mast, enlarged wing root intakes, and enlarged oil cooler intake. The 4th Series used a Klimov M-105PA engine of 890 kW (1,200 hp) During 1941 2,463 LaGG-3's were produced with 2,141 being built after their factories were relocated to the East. The counterweight at the bottom of the rudder from the 1st Series was deleted of the 4th Series. In an effort to improve performance the fuel capacity was reduced from 904 lb (410 kg) to 749 lb (340 kg) and range was reduced to 438 mi (705 km).
8th Series
The 8th Series reduced the armament of the LaGG-3 by removing the two cowl mounted ShKAS machine guns and standardizing on the axially mounted ShVAK and one Berezin machine gun. The ShKAS machine guns were removed because they were believed to be dead weight because the 7.62 mm only caused minor damage to control surfaces, oil coolers, and radiators of enemy aircraft. A few had a 23 mm (0.91 in) VYa-23 cannon in place of a ShVAK depending on availability.
11th Series
The 11th Series was similar to the 8th Series except it was modified as a ground attack aircraft. The conversion included adding two wing-mounted D3-40 bomb racks and six RO-82 launch rails for RS-82 or RS-132 rockets. The D3-40 bomb racks could carry 50 kg (110 lb) bombs such as the FAB-50 or 83 L (22 US gal) drop tanks. The racks could also be used for chemical weapon dispensers or napalm dispensers. The LaGG-3 could also be modified to use ski landing gear and when combined with external stores this caused further performance degradation.

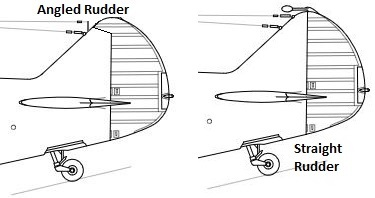
23rd Series horn-balanced [aerodynamic] vs aerodynamically unbalanced [straight] rudder. Deleted mass balance and revised antenna.

23rd Series
The rudder of the 23rd series could be differentiated from earlier aircraft because it now had an aerodynamic horn balance in front of the hinge line at the top of the rudder while the previous rudder was aerodynamically unbalanced with no protrusion in front of the hinge line [straight]. During the production of the 23rd Series, some factories switched to producing the more effective Yakovlev Yak-1 and Yak-7.

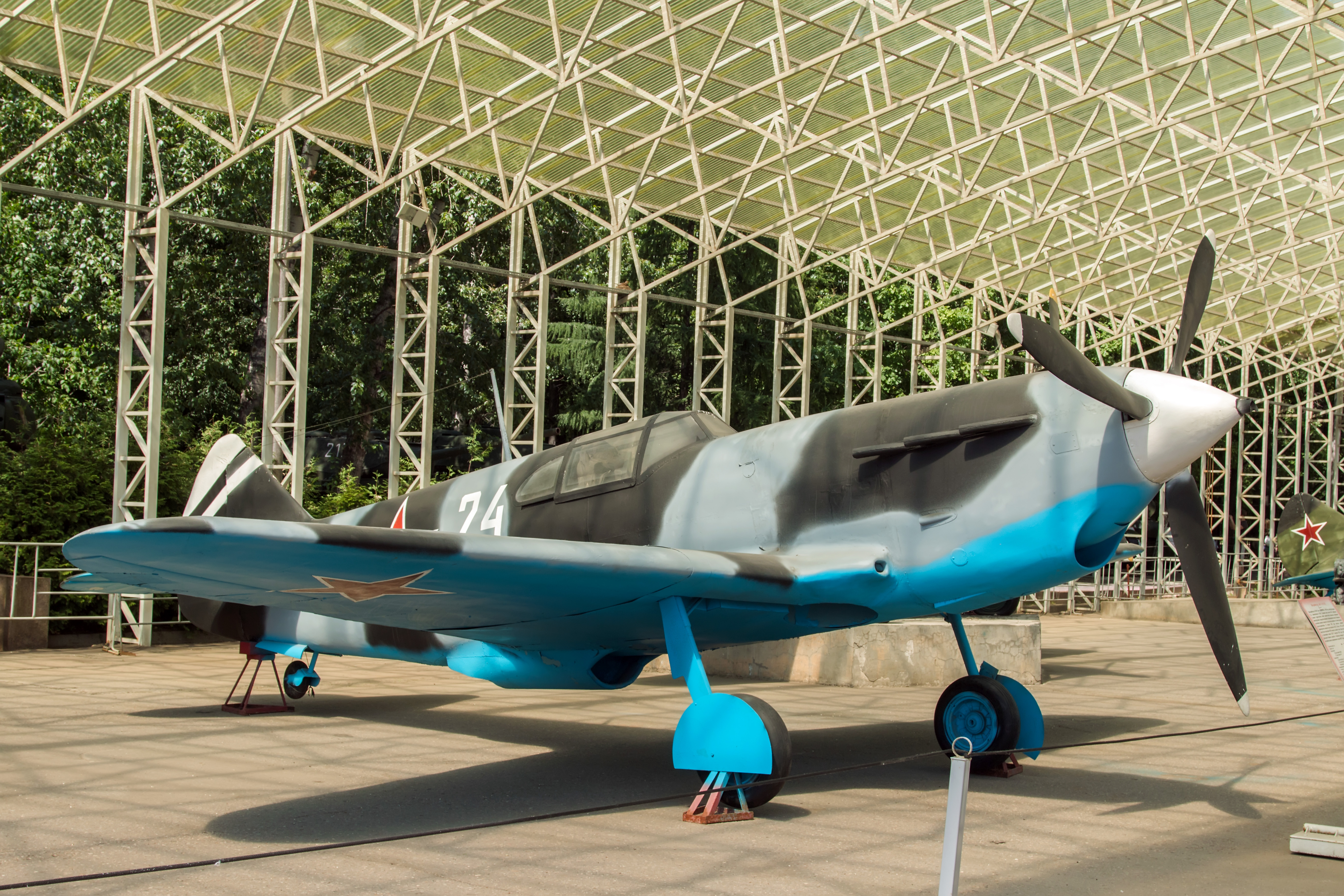
Replica of a 29th Series LaGG-3

29th Series
The 29th Series introduced the Klimov M-105PF engine of 940 kW (1,260 hp). The difference between the PA and PF was the PA was rated to 4,000 m (13,123 ft) where the PF was rated to 2,700 m (8,858 ft) since the majority of air combat on the Eastern Front happened below 2,700 m (9,000 ft). The 29th series also deleted the exhaust collector tube on the earlier series and had three exhaust ports. 29th Series aircraft also switched to variable frequency RSI-4 series radios because the previous RSI-3 radios were poor quality. A combination of lighter weight and more engine power meant the top speed of the 29th Series rose by 31 km/h (19 mph) to 565 km/h (351 mph) and its rate of climb improved.

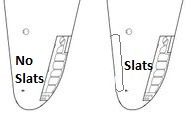
Early hard wing vs 35th Series leading edge slats.

33rd Series
The 33rd Series switched to the new VISh-105SV propeller with a larger spinner.
34th Series
The 34th Series was built in limited numbers and replaced the 20 mm ShVAK cannon with a 37 mm (1.5 in) Nudelman-Suranov NS-37 with twenty rounds. The 34th Series was intended to be an anti-tank aircraft and 40 were deployed to Stalingrad for combat evaluation. However, it was not a success because the weight of the gun shifted the center of gravity forward and the recoil forces damaged the engine.
35th Series
The 35th Series introduced automatic leading-edge slats on the outer wings to improve handling, a retractable tail wheel, and enlarged radiator.
66th Series
The 66th Series was the last series of the LaGG-3 produced from spring 1943 to mid 1944 before production at Factory 31 in Tbilisi was switched to the Yak-3. It was 175 kg (385 lb) lighter than previous aircraft. The 66th Series can be visually identified by its four exhaust stacks, short antenna, new windscreen, reshaped radiator, and reshaped oil cooler. The 66th Series was the fastest of all LaGG-3's at 591 km/h (367 mph) and its light weight meant it was the most maneuverable and had the best climb rate. However, despite its improvements, it was outclassed by its Yakovlev competitors or enemy aircraft such as the Messerschmitt Bf 109 and the Focke-Wulf Fw 190.

=== Minor variants ===
LaGG-3 M-107
In a bid to improve the LaGG-3 and keep it in production Lavochkin fitted a Klimov VK-107 engine capable of 970 kW (1,300 hp) at 5,000 m (16,400 ft) to a LaGG-3. All 33 test flights were cut short due to persistent engine overheating and when run at lower rpm it offered no performance advantage over the Klimov M-105P.
Gudkov Gu-82
As an insurance policy against the failure of the Klimov VK-107 a single LaGG-3 was fitted with a 1,150 kW (1,540 hp) Shvetsov M-82 14-cylinder radial air-cooled engine and propeller from a Sukhoi Su-2. This eventually led to the La-5.
Gudkov K-37
1st Series anti-tank aircraft with a Shpitalny Sh-37 axial cannon firing through the spinner hub; 20 were built in the summer of 1942 and delivered to the 42nd IAP. The Sh-37 was powerful enough to down an enemy fighter with a single hit. Its shell could punch a hole with an area of over 1 m^{2} (11 sq ft).
Gorbunov 105
In May 1943 a new variant of the LaGG-3 designed by Gorbunov and was designated the Gorbunov 105. This new variant introduced a number of improvements such as better streamlining, lighter weight, cut down rear fuselage, and new canopy to improve rear vision. An area of emphasis for the 105 was improved streamlining of the sheet metal nose sections but still powered by the Klimov M-105PF with test data supplied from the Yak-1M. The takeoff weight was 2,875 kg (6,338 lb) versus the 2,999 kg (6,611 lb) for 66th Series aircraft and had a top speed of 618 km/h (384 mph) at 3,400 m (11,200 ft) versus 589 km/h (366 mph) for 66th Series aircraft. This lighter weight and streamlining improved the rate of climb and maneuverability with a turn taking 16 seconds and time to 5,000 m (16,400 ft) dropping to 4.7 minutes. Despite not having wing slats like late series LaGG-3s the test pilot reported that the Gorbunov 105 was 'superior to all Messerschmitt variants in terms of trouble free handling and maneuverability'.
Gorbunov 105-2
A second Gorbunov prototype the 105-2 power by a Klimov M-105PF-2 of 970 kW (1,300 hp) and armed with one VYa-23 and one Berezin UBS was completed in February 1944. During testing in May–June 1944 the test pilot said 'In terms of maximum speed and climb rate the Gorbunov 105-2 is inferior to the Yak-lM tested at the NIl in October 1943 ... because of oil and water overheating, flight at maximum speed can be sustained for only three or four minutes'. Despite having a more powerful engine performance wasn't improved and it was decided to produce the Yak-3 and La-5 instead.
LaGG-3IT
66th Series aircraft with a Nudelman-Suranov NS-37 cannon.

== Operators ==
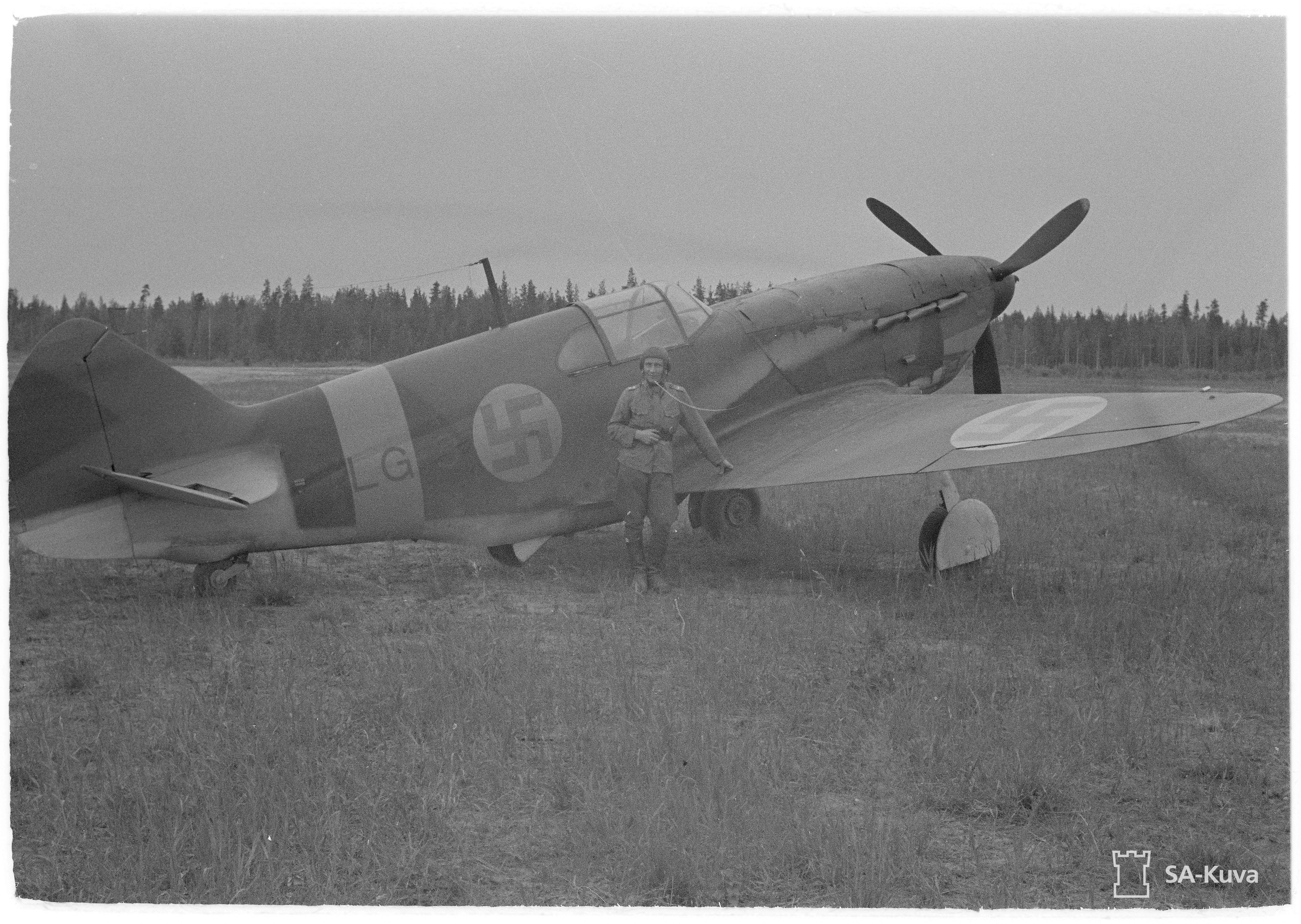
Finnish Air Force LaGG-3

Finland

- Finnish Air Force - operated three captured examples, mainly as bomber interceptors. Warrant officer Eino Koskinen scored the sole kill achieved by a LaGG-3 in Finnish colors, when he downed a Soviet LaGG-3 on 16 February 1944 in the plane marked as LG-1.

Germany

- Luftwaffe - operated captured examples for tests. One captured example was used for a propaganda movie in 1943.

Japan

- Imperial Japanese Army Air Service - operated one flown into Manchuria by a defector. It was used for testing.

Soviet Union

- Soviet Air Force

== Specifications (LaGG-3 (data for 66th Series LaGG-3)) ==
4th Series LaGG-3

Data from Jane's Fighting Aircraft of World War II

General characteristics

- Crew: 1
- Length: 8.81 m (28 ft 11 in)
- Wingspan: 9.8 m (32 ft 2 in)
- Height: 2.54 m (8 ft 4 in)
- Wing area: 17.4 m^{2} (187 sq ft)
- Empty weight: 2,205 kg (4,861 lb)
- Gross weight: 2,620 kg (5,776 lb)
- Max takeoff weight: 3,190 kg (7,033 lb)
- Powerplant: 1 × Klimov M-105PF V-12 liquid-cooled piston engine, 924 kW (1,239 hp)
- Propellers: 3-bladed constant-speed propeller

Performance

- Maximum speed: 589 km/h (366 mph, 318 kn)
- Range: 1,000 km (620 mi, 540 nmi)
- Service ceiling: 9,700 m (31,800 ft)
- Rate of climb: 14.9 m/s (2,930 ft/min)
- Wing loading: 150 kg/m^{2} (31 lb/sq ft)
- Power/mass: 0.350 kW/kg (0.213 hp/lb)

Armament
Guns:

- 1 × 12.7 mm (0.50 in) Berezin BS machine gun
- 1 × 20 mm ShVAK cannon

External stores:

- 2 × 50 kg (110 lb) bombs or
- 2 × 83 L (22 gal) drop tanks or
- 6 × RS-82 or RS-132 rockets

== See also ==
Related development

- LaGG-1
- Lavochkin La-5
- Lavochkin La-7
- Gudkov Gu-82

Aircraft of comparable role, configuration, and era

- Curtiss P-40 Warhawk
- Dewoitine D.520
- Hawker Tornado
- Heinkel He 100
- Kawasaki Ki-61
- Macchi C.202
- Messerschmitt Bf 109
- Mikoyan-Gurevich MiG-3
- Republic P-43 Lancer
- Supermarine Spitfire
- Vultee P-66 Vanguard
- Weiss Manfréd WM-23 Ezüst Nyíl
- Yakovlev Yak-1

Related lists

- List of fighter aircraft
- List of aircraft of World War II
- List of military aircraft of the Soviet Union and the CIS
