= Lavochkin La-126 =

Soviet WWII prototype fighter aircraft

General information
- Type: Fighter
- National origin: USSR
- Manufacturer: OKB Lavochkin

History
- Developed from: Lavochkin La-7 via the Lavochkin La-120
- Developed into: Lavochkin La-130

The Lavochkin La-126 was a World War II Soviet prototype piston-engined fighter aircraft.

== Development ==
Despite its superb performance, the Lavochkin La-7 fighter had a major drawback—much of its airframe was made of wood. In addition to being heavier than metal, the wooden structure was prone to rotting and warping when exposed to the elements, which at times, led to nasty surprises during flight and could ground entire squadrons. The solution was to create an all-metal airframe. In 1944, a La-7 was successfully tested with 23 mm Nudelman-Suranov NS-23 cannon. At the same time, the La-7L was tested with a new laminar flow wing by TsAGI, and another La-7 was tested with the new Shvetsov ASh-83 motor. While only slightly more powerful than a Shvetsov ASh-82FN, the ASh-83 had much better performance at high altitude. All of these developments were combined in the new La-120 prototype with mostly metal construction, NS-23 cannon, laminar flow wing, and ASh-83 engine. Flight testing began in January 1945, with the aircraft reaching a top speed of 735 km/h (457 mph). However, the ASh-83 engine proved unreliable and La-120 development was stopped after two prototypes.

The La-120 design directly evolved into La-126. The aircraft was equipped with the proven ASh-82FN engine and the laminar flow wing was perfected, eliminating the need for leading-edge slats. This was a welcome change as the slats on La-7 had a tendency for unsynchronized deployment, with a serious impact on aircraft handling. Flight testing of the La-126 was completed by 1946 with somewhat disappointing results. While the armament of four 23 mm NS-23 cannon represented a leap over the La-7 with three 20 mm Berezin B-20 (projectile mass from a one-second burst had increased from 3.1 kg (6.8 lb) on La-7 to 6 kg (13.2 lb) on La-126), there was no significant improvement in performance. As a result, the La-126 never advanced beyond the prototype stage. The concept of an all-metal La-7 was finally realized with the Lavochkin La-9.

== Specifications (La-126) ==
Data from

General characteristics

- Crew: 1
- Length: 8.63 m (28 ft 4 in)
- Wingspan: 9.8 m (32 ft 2 in)
- Height: 3.56 m (11 ft 8 in)
- Wing area: 17.6 m^{2} (189 sq ft)
- Airfoil: TsAGI Laminar Airfoil-->
- Empty weight: 2,579 kg (5,686 lb)
- Gross weight: 3,315 kg (7,308 lb)
- Powerplant: 1 × Shvetsov ASh-82FN 14-cylinder air-cooled radial piston engine, 1,380 kW (1,850 hp) with a one-stage two-speed supercharger and fuel injection
- Propellers: 3-bladed constant-speed propeller

Performance

- Maximum speed: 690 km/h (430 mph, 370 kn) at altitude
- Range: 700 km (430 mi, 380 nmi)
- Service ceiling: 10,800 m (35,400 ft)
- Rate of climb: 17.8 m/s (3,500 ft/min)
- Wing loading: 188 kg/m^{2} (39 lb/sq ft)
- Power/mass: 0.42 kW/kg (0.26 hp/lb)

Armament

- Guns: 4 × 23 mm Nudelman-Suranov NS-23 cannon with 50 rpg

== See also ==
Related development

- Lavochkin La-9
- Lavochkin La-130

Aircraft of comparable role, configuration, and era

- Focke-Wulf Fw 190
