= Semyon Lavochkin =

Soviet aerospace engineer and aircraft designer

- Семён Лaвочкин
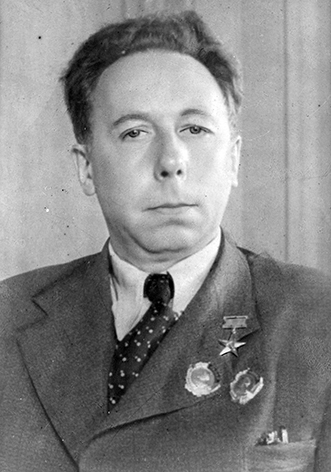
- Lavochkin in 1943
- Born: 11 September 1900; Smolensk, Russian Empire
- Died: 9 June 1960 (aged 59); Karagandy Province, Kazakh SSR, USSR
- Engineering career
- Discipline: Aeronautical Engineering
- Employer: Lavochkin design bureau

Semyon Alekseyevich Lavochkin (Russian: Семён Алексе́евич Ла́вочкин; 11 September 1900 – 9 June 1960) was a Soviet aerospace engineer, Soviet aircraft designer who founded the Lavochkin aircraft design bureau. Many of his fighter designs were produced in large numbers for Soviet forces during World War II.

== Biography ==
Lavochkin was born to a Jewish family in Smolensk. His father, Alter Ilyich Lavochkin, was a melamed, his mother, Gita Savelyevna, was a housewife. In 1917 he graduated from the Kursk gymnasium. He enlisted in the Red Army and served in the infantry in the Russian Civil War. In 1920, he began studies at the Moscow State Technical University, from which he graduated in 1927. He then served for two years as an intern at the design department of the Central Aerohydrodynamic Institute under the direction of Andrei Tupolev, where he assisted in the design of the Tupolev TB-3 heavy bomber. While at TsAGI, his colleagues included the French seaplane designer Paul Richard, as well as Mikhail Gurevich and Nikolay Kamov.

In the early 1930s, he transferred to the Central Design Office, where he was assigned work on stratospheric aircraft, balloons and pressurized cockpits. However, as he came increasingly interested in the design of fighter aircraft, he moved to the design office of Dmitry Pavlovich Grigorovich, whom he assisted in the development of the Grigorovich I-Z fighter.

In 1938, after combat experiences in the Spanish Civil War and at the Battles of Khalkhin Gol against the Japanese, it became clear that the Soviet fighter designs were lagging behind international standards. Lavochkin established his own design bureau in 1939. Starting with the LaGG-1, he produced thousands of fighters which formed the backbone of the Soviet Air Force during the Second World War. He is especially known for the La-5 and La-7, which are among the best Soviet fighter aircraft of World War II. The top Allied ace, Ivan Kozhedub shot down over 60 German airplanes, flying in fighters designed by Lavochkin. From 1941 to 1945 a total of over 22,000 Lavochkin fighters were produced.

However, Lavochkin's fortunes faded after the war. His La-9 and La-11 were the last piston-engined fighters in Soviet service, and were replaced after a short time by jets. Although he continued pioneering work in this field (the La-176 was the first Soviet supersonic aircraft), his aircraft consistently placed second in competitions with other design bureaux, notably that of Artem Mikoyan. A notable exception was the Lavochkin La-15 jet fighter, a relative success.

At the end of WWII, forward thinking and competition in jet engine driven planes in Soviet Union pushed Lavochkin to start development of rocket systems. The outcome of that decision was SA-2 Guideline and a Burya. The LA-350 (Burya) is notable for the first in the world production use of Titanium and a thruster cooling by use of reverse flow of propellent.

In 1944, Lavochkin was given the honorary rank of Major-General of Engineering/Technical Service. From 1950 to 1958, Lavochkin also served as a deputy of the Supreme Soviet of the USSR. He also became an Academician of USSR Academy of Sciences in 1958. He died in 1960 due to a heart attack during a test of an air defense system in the Kazakh SSR at the age of 59 and was buried in the Novodevichy Cemetery.

After his death the focus of the design office shifted to surface to air missiles (most notably the SA-2 Guideline), and to space projects.

=== Family ===
His father was Alter Ilyich Lavochkin (1875–1927), a teacher. Mother — Gita Savelyevna (1874–1952), housewife. Brother — Yakov Alterovich Lavochkin (1904–1942), died at the front. Sister — Khaya Alterovna Lavochkina (1908–1994).

His wife, Rosa Gertsevna Lavochkina (1903–1994), was a philologist, was in charge of the library.

- Daughter — Alla Semyonovna Lavochkina (1930–2001).
- Son — Alexander (Alik) Semyonovich Lavochkin (1938–1967), graduated Moscow Aviation Institute, worked at the Mil Moscow Helicopter Plant.

== Awards and honors ==
- Hero of Socialist Labour, twice (1943, 1956)
- Stalin Prizes;
  - first degree (1941, 1946, 1948)
  - second degree (1943)
- Order of Lenin, three times
- Order of the Red Banner
- Order of Suvorov first and second degrees
- Medal for Combat Service

== Memory ==
In 1960 immediately after Lavochkin's death, by decision of the government, OKB-301 received a new name — "Lavochkin Machine-Building Plant". Now the NPO Lavochkin.

In the cities of Volgograd, Moscow, Lipetsk, Smolensk, Krasnodar, Khimki, Hadera (Israel) there are streets that bear the Name of S. A. Lavochkin.

Memorial plaques are installed:

- at the house No.19 on Tverskaya Street (Moscow), where S. A. Lavochkin lived;
- on Agurina Street (Akhtubinsk, Astrakhan Oblast);
- at the house No.16 on Chaadaev Street (Nizhny Novgorod), where S. A. Lavochkin lived in 1940–1944, heading OKB-21.

In 1985 the USSR Ministry of Communications issued an artistic stamped envelope with a portrait of S. A. Lavochkin.
