= Lavochkin La-7 =

Fighter aircraft family

La-7
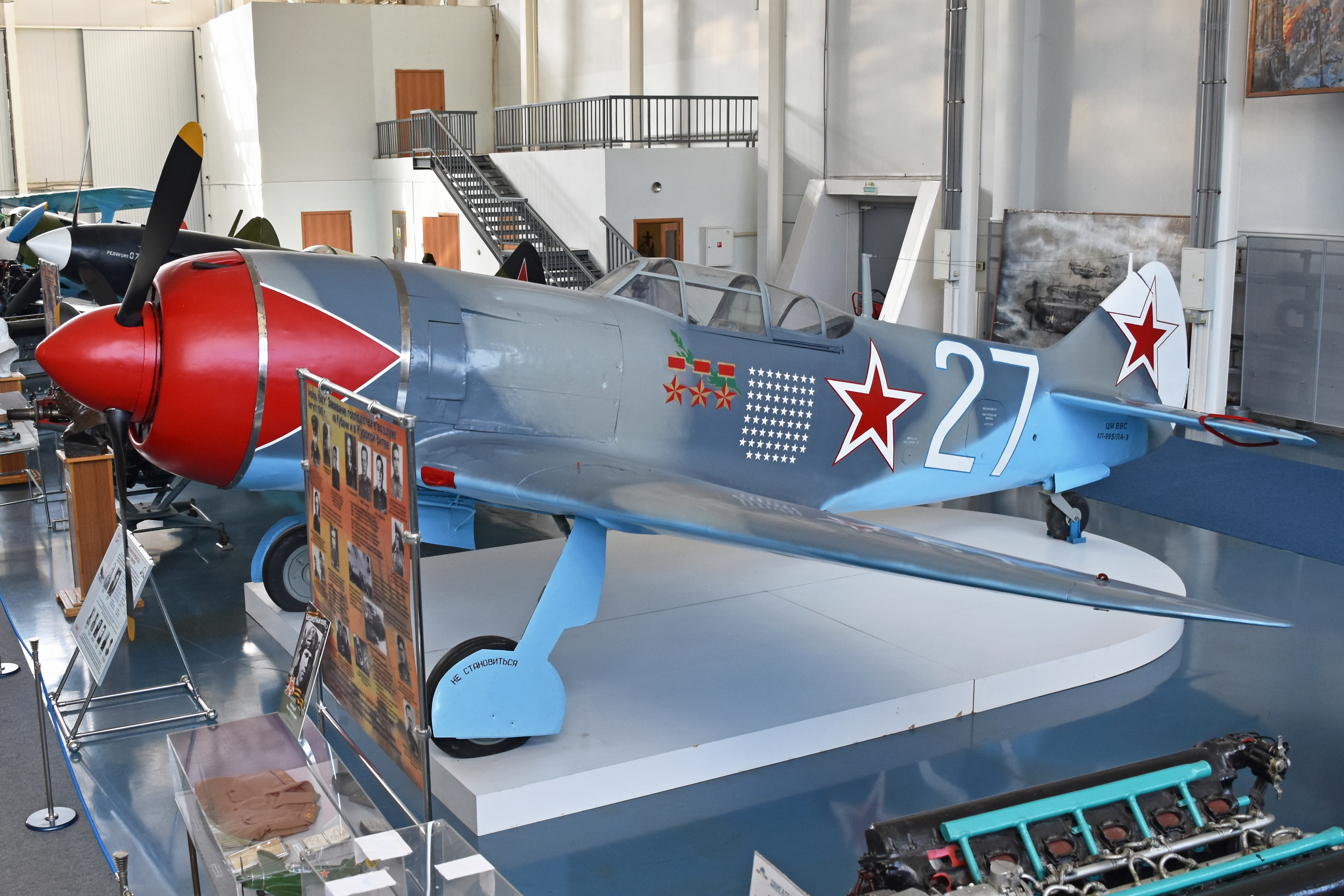
- La-7 in the Central Air Force Museum, Monino, Russia

General information
- Type: Fighter
- National origin: Soviet Union
- Designer: S.A. Lavochkin Design Bureau
- Built by: Plant No.21 (Gorky), Plant No.381 (Moscow), Plant No.99 (Ulan-Ude)
- Status: Retired
- Primary users: Soviet Air Forces Czechoslovak Air Force
- Number built: 5,753 (+ 582 trainers)

History
- Manufactured: May 1944 - August 1946
- Introduction date: June 1944
- First flight: 1 February 1944 (La-5 mod. 1944)
- Retired: 1952 (Soviet Air Forces)
- Developed from: Lavochkin La-5
- Developed into: Lavochkin La-126

The Lavochkin La-7 (Russian: Лавочкин Ла-7; NATO reporting name: Fin) is a piston-engined single-seat fighter aircraft developed by the Soviet Union during World War II by the Lavochkin Design Bureau. It was a development and refinement of the Lavochkin La-5, and the last in a family of aircraft that had begun with the LaGG-1 in 1938. Its first flight was in early 1944 and it entered service with the Soviet Air Forces later in the year. A small batch of La-7s was given to the Czechoslovak Air Force the following year, but otherwise it was not exported. Armed with two or three 20 mm (0.8 in) cannon, it had a top speed of 661 kilometers per hour (411 mph). The La-7 was felt by its pilots to be at least the equal of any German piston-engined fighter. It was phased out in 1947 by the Soviet Air Force, but served until 1950 with the Czechoslovak Air Force.

== Design and development ==
By 1943, the La-5 had become a mainstay of the Soviet Air Forces, yet both its head designer, Semyon Lavochkin, as well as the engineers at the Central Aerohydrodynamics Institute (Russian: TsAGI), felt that it could be improved upon. TsAGI refined earlier studies of aerodynamic improvements to the La-5 airframe in mid-1943 and modified La-5FN c/n 39210206 to evaluate the changes. These included complete sealing of the engine cowling, rearrangement of the wing center section to accommodate the oil cooler and the relocation of the engine air intake from the top of the cowling to the bottom to improve the pilot's view.

The aircraft was evaluated between December 1943 and February 1944 and proved to have exceptional performance. Using the same engine as the standard La-5FN c/n 39210206 had a top speed of 684 kilometers per hour (425 mph) at a height of 6,150 meters (20,180 ft), some 64 kilometers per hour (40 mph) faster than the production La-5FN. It took 5.2 minutes to climb to 5,000 meters (16,404 ft). It was faster at low to medium altitudes than the La-5 that used the more powerful prototype Shvetsov M-71 engine.

Lavochkin had been monitoring TsAGI's improvements and began construction in January 1944 of an improved version of the La-5 that incorporated them as well as lighter, but stronger, metal wing spars to save weight. The La-5, as well as its predecessors, had been built mostly of wood to conserve strategic materials such as aircraft alloys. With Soviet strategists now confident that supplies of these alloys were unlikely to become a problem, Lavochkin was now able to replace some wooden parts with alloy components. In addition Lavochkin made a number of other changes that differed from c/n 39210206. The engine air intake was moved from the bottom of the engine cowling to the wing roots, the wing/fuselage fillets were streamlined, each engine cylinder was provided with its own exhaust pipe, the engine cowling covers were reduced in number, a rollbar was added to the cockpit, longer shock struts were fitted for the main landing gear while that for the tail wheel was shortened, an improved PB-1B(V) gunsight was installed, and a new VISh-105V-4 propeller was fitted. Three prototype 20 mm (0.79 in) Berezin B-20 autocannon were mounted in the engine cowling, firing through the propeller, arming the 1944 standard-setter (etalon), as the modified aircraft was named.

The etalon only made nine test flights in February and March 1944 before testing had to be suspended after two engine failures, but quickly proved itself to be the near-equal of c/n 39210206. It was 180 kilograms (400 lb) lighter than the earlier aircraft, which allowed the etalon to out-climb the other aircraft (4.45 minutes against 5.2 minutes climb to 5,000 meters). It was 33 kilometres per hour (20.5 mph) slower at sea level, but only 4 kilometers per hour (2.5 mph) slower at 6,000 meters (19,685 ft). The flight tests validated Lavochkin's modifications and it was ordered into production under the designation of La-7, although the B-20 cannon were not yet ready for production and the production La-7 retained the two 20-mm ShVAK cannon armament of the La-5.

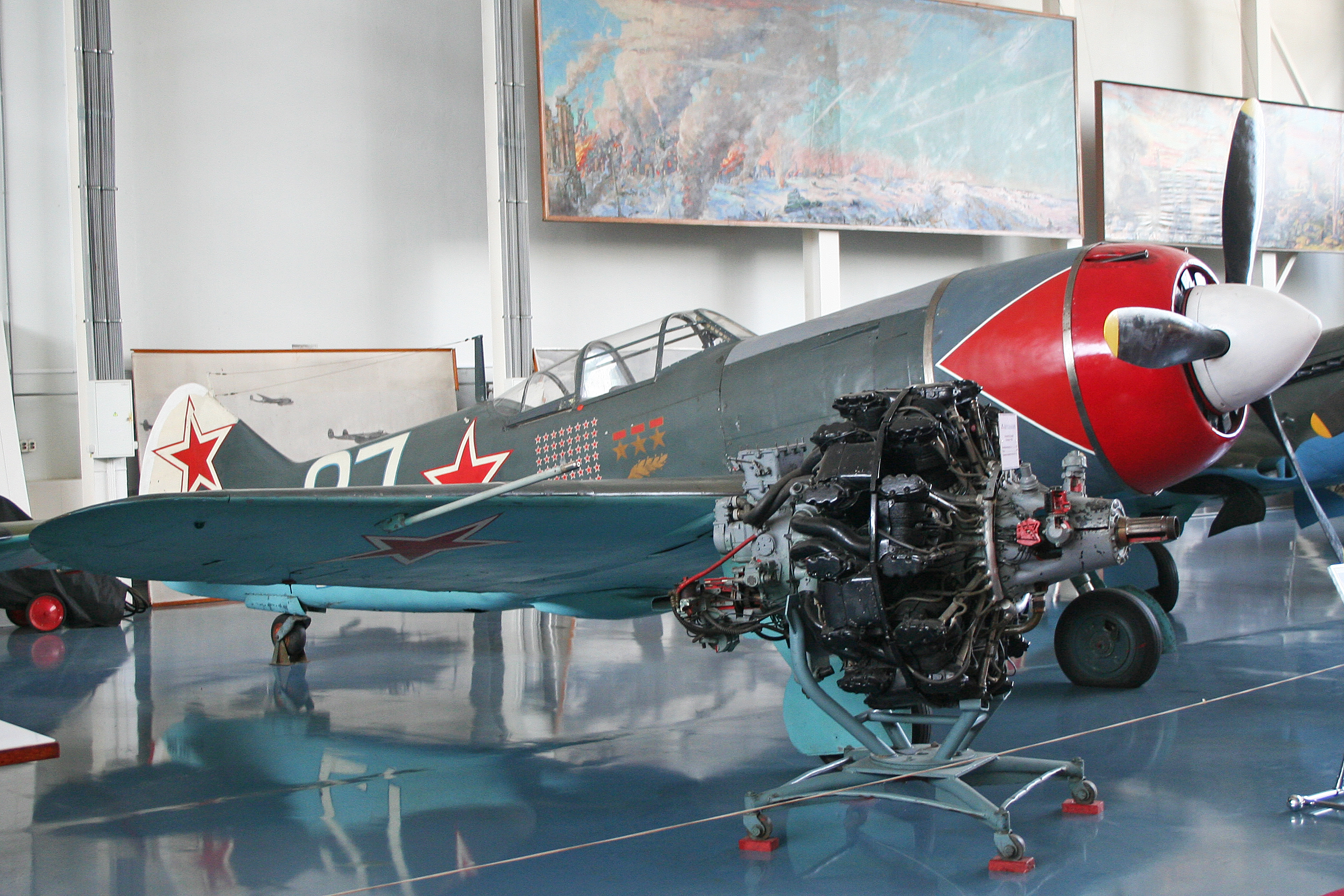
La-7 with Shvetsov ASh-82FN engine

Five La-7s were built in March by Factory (Zavod) Nr. 381 in Moscow and three of these were accepted by the Air Force that same month. The Moscow factory was the fastest to complete transition over to La-7 production and the last La-5FN was built there in May 1944. Zavod Nr. 21 in Gorky was considerably slower to make the change as it did not exhaust its stock of wooden La-5 wings until October. The quality of the early production aircraft was significantly less than the etalon due to issues with the engine, incomplete sealing of the cowling and fuselage, and defective propellers. One such aircraft was tested, after these problems had been fixed, by the Flight Research Institute (Lyotno-Issledovatel'skiy Institut) and proved to be only 6 kilometers per hour (3.7 mph) slower than the etalon at altitude. Aircraft from both factories were evaluated in September by the Air Force Scientific Test Institute (NII VVS) and the problems persisted as the aircraft could only reach 658 kilometers per hour (409 mph) at a height of 5,900 meters (19,357 ft) and had a time to altitude of 5.1 minutes to 5,000 m (16,000 ft).

Combat trials began in mid-September 1944 and were generally very positive. However four aircraft were lost to engine failures and the engines suffered from numerous lesser problems, despite its satisfactory service in the La-5FN. One cause was the lower position of the engine air intakes in the wing roots of the La-7 which caused the engine to ingest sand and dust. One batch of flawed wings was built and caused six accidents, four of them fatal, in October which caused the fighter to be grounded until the cause was determined to be a defect in the wing spar.

Production of the first aircraft fitted with three B-20 cannon began in January 1945 when 74 were delivered. These aircraft were 65 kilograms (143 lb) heavier than those aircraft with the two ShVAK guns, but the level speed was slightly improved over the original aircraft. However, the time to climb to 5,000 m (16,000 ft) increased by two-tenths of a second over the older model. More than 2,000 aircraft were delivered before the war's end, most by Zavod Nr. 21. A total of 5,753 aircraft had been built by Zavod Nr. 21, Nr. 381, and Nr. 99 in Ulan-Ude, when production ended in early 1946.

== Operational history ==
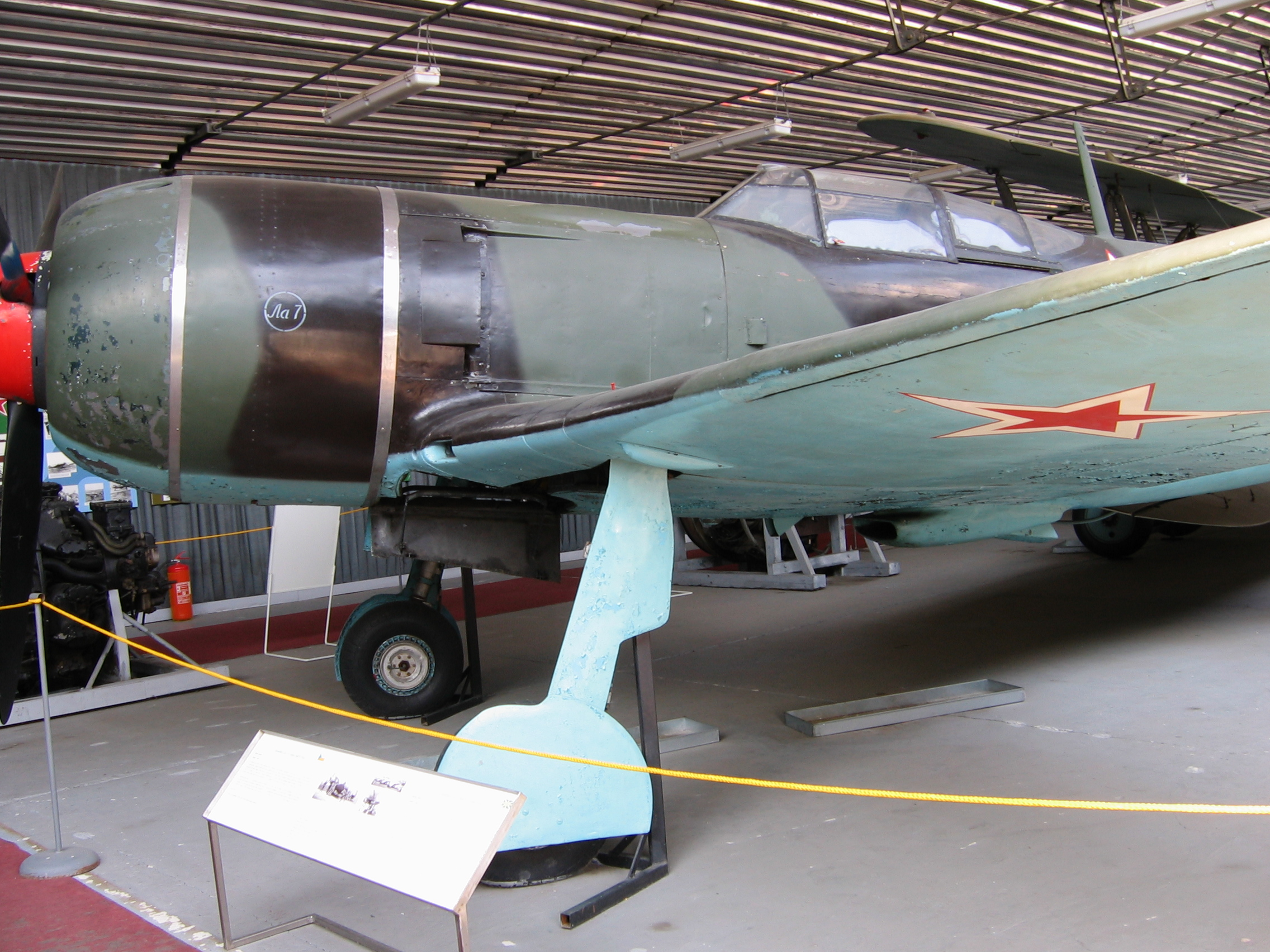
A La-7 of the Czech Air Force on display at the Prague Aviation Museum, Kbely

The 63rd Guards Fighter Aviation Regiment (GIAP) began combat trials of the La-7 in mid-September 1944 in support of the 1st Baltic Front. Thirty aircraft were provided for the trials, which lasted one month. During this time the new fighters made 462 individual sorties and claimed 55 aerial victories while losing four aircraft in combat. Four other La-7s were lost to non-combat causes, mostly related to engine problems. A total of three pilots were killed during the trials to all causes.

63rd GIAP regimental commander Colonel Yevgeny Gorbatyuk, a Hero of the Soviet Union, commented: "The La-7 exhibited unquestionable advantages over German aircraft in multiple air combats. In addition to fighter tasks, photo reconnaissance and bombing were undertaken with success. The aircraft surpasses the La-5FN in speed, manoeuvrability, and, especially, in the landing characteristics. It requires changes in its armament, and urgent fixing of its engine." The twin ShVAK armament inherited from the La-5 was no longer powerful enough to bring down later, more heavily armored German fighters, especially the Focke-Wulf Fw 190, in a single burst, even when Soviet pilots opened fire at ranges of only 50–100 meters (160–330 ft).

The 156th Fighter Aviation Regiment of the 4th Air Army was the next unit to receive the La-7 in October 1944. At one point during the month, they had fourteen aircraft simultaneously unserviceable with engine failures. By 1 January 1945 there were 398 La-7s in front-line service of which 107 were unserviceable. By 9 May 1945 this had increased to 967 aircraft, of which only 169 were unserviceable. For the invasion of Japanese Manchuria, 313 La-7s were assigned and only 28 of these were unserviceable on 9 August 1945.

The La-7 was flown by the top Soviet ace of the war, Ivan Nikitovich Kozhedub and was successfully used by him to down an Me 262 jet fighter, one of the few such shoot downs of the war. Kozhedub, a three-time Hero of Soviet Union, scored his last 17 air victories in 1945 in the La-7 numbered 27, which is now preserved in the Central Air Force Museum at Monino on the outskirts of Moscow.

One fighter regiment of the 1st Czechoslovak Composite Aviation Division was later equipped with the La-7 after participating in the Slovak National Uprising of August–October 1944 with La-5FN. A total of 56 aircraft were delivered and equipped the 1st and 2nd Fighter Regiments. The bulk of the aircraft, however, were delivered in 1945 and saw no combat during the war. It remained in service with the Czechoslovaks until 1950 and was designated postwar by them as the S-97. One of these aircraft survives in the Prague Aviation Museum, Kbely. Despite reports to the contrary, no La-7s were ever sold or transferred to the People's Republic of China or North Korea. Such reports arose from misidentification by Western pilots of the La-9s or La-11s that were given to those countries.

The British test pilot, Eric Brown, was given the chance to fly an La-7 at the former Erprobungsstelle Tarnewitz Luftwaffe aircraft test station on the Baltic coast, shortly after the German surrender in May 1945. He described the handling and performance as "quite superb", but the armament and sights were "below par", the "wooden construction would have withstood little combat punishment" and the instrumentation was "appallingly basic".

Production of the La-7 amounted to 5,753 aircraft, plus 584 La-7UTI trainers. (Note: It is uncertain if these La-7UTIs are included in the overall production total.) Those aircraft still in service after the end of the war were given the NATO reporting name Fin. The follow-up model, the La-9, despite its outward similarity, was a completely new design.

=== Tactical significance ===
The La-7 ended the superiority in vertical maneuverability that the Messerschmitt Bf 109G had previously enjoyed over other Soviet fighters. Furthermore, it was fast enough at low altitudes to catch, albeit with some difficulties, Focke-Wulf Fw 190 fighter-bombers that attacked Soviet units on the front lines and immediately returned to German-controlled airspace at full speed. The Yakovlev Yak-3 and the Yakovlev Yak-9U with the Klimov VK-107 engine lacked a large enough margin of speed to overtake the German raiders. 115 La-7s were lost in air combat, only half the number of Yak-3s. According to VVS-KA records, only 3 La-7s were actually shot down in air combat in all of 1944 and a mere 10 fell victim to anti-aircraft fire with a further 23 due to non-combat cause. Losses to air combat in 1945 stand at 79 in total, with 115 overall. However, aircraft that went missing (not returning) or lost to wear are not included, e.g. 24 additional La-7s went missing in 1944. However, the total VVS-KA record loss may not give a true picture of combat losses, as combat losses were often claimed as non-combat losses either to conceal losses or for propaganda purposes.

== Variants ==
=== La-7TK ===
One aircraft used to evaluate the TK-3 turbosupercharger in July 1944 in the hopes of improving high-altitude performance. It was destroyed when the TK-3 disintegrated in flight.

=== La-7R ===
Testbed for a tail-mounted liquid-fuelled RD-1KhZ rocket engine. The rocket was rated at 300 kilograms-force (660 lbf) of thrust and its fuel (90 liters (20 imp gal; 24 U.S. gal) of kerosene and 180 liters (40 imp gal; 48 U.S. gal) of red fuming nitric acid) was expected to last between three and three and a half minutes. While the rocket was firing it increased the fighter's speed by 80 kilometers per hour (50 mph), but the aircraft's other flying qualities deteriorated. Fifteen flights were made in the first quarter of 1945, although the rocket exploded on the ground on 12 May. The aircraft was repaired, but later had an explosion in flight although the pilot managed to land it safely. Details of any later flights are unknown, but the La-7R was displayed at the August 1946 Tushino Airshow with the rocket firing.

=== La-7PVRD ===
Testbed for two underwing ramjet engines. The aircraft was expected to reach a speed of 800 kilometers per hour (497 mph) at a height of 6,000 metres (19,685 ft), but could not exceed 670 kilometers per hour (416 mph) due to the high drag of the ramjets.

=== La-7/M-71 ===
One aircraft was fitted with the Shvetsov M-71 for trials in 1944. However the engine was not yet ready for service and the program was cancelled.

=== La-7UTI ===
Two-seat trainer version. Armament reduced to a single 20 mm gun and the oil cooler was relocated underneath the engine cowling. Fitted with a radio compass and gun camera. Considerably heavier than the fighter at 3,500 kilograms (7,716 lb), but it retained the flying characteristics of the single-seat aircraft. 584 built, the last two delivered in 1947.

== Operators ==
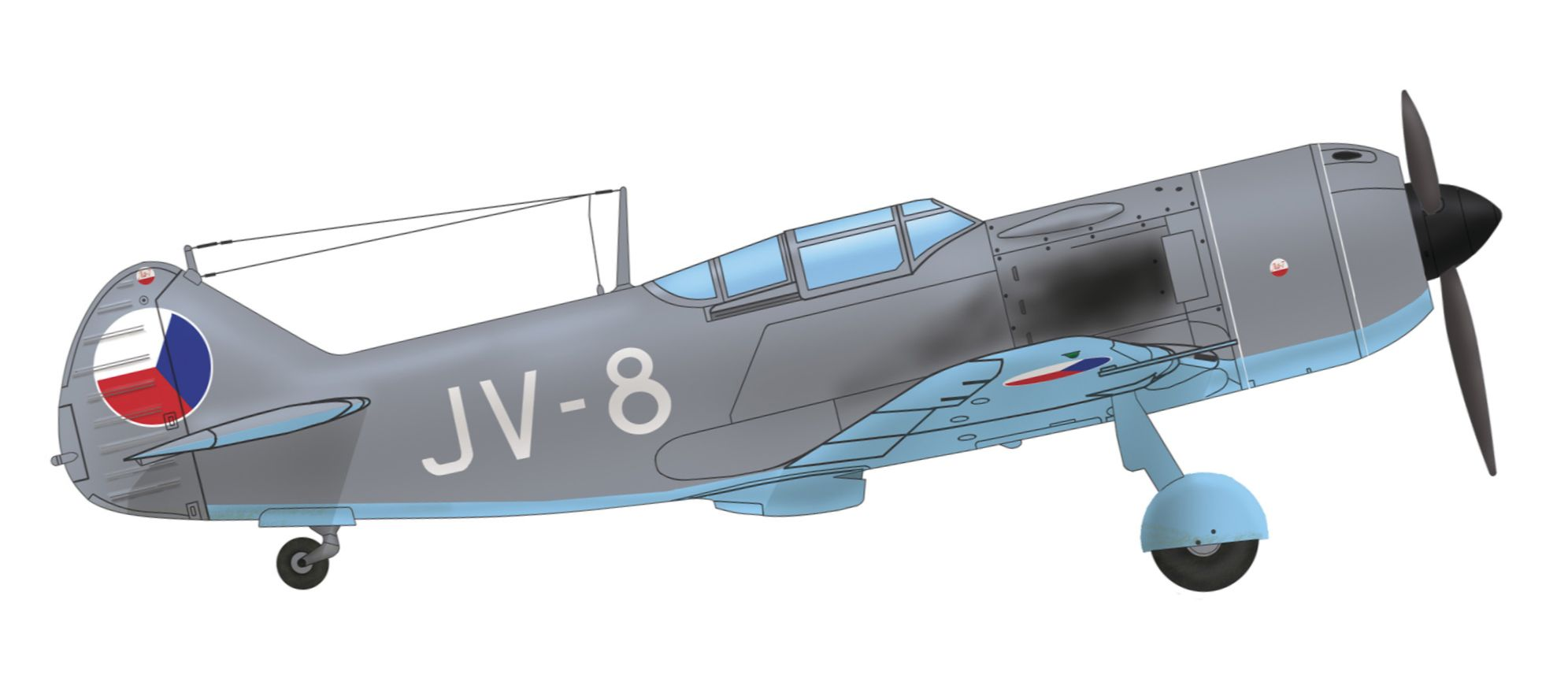
Lavochkin La-7 of the 2nd Flight, 1st Fighter Regiment, 4th Air Division, Czechoslovak Air Force, 1947

Czechoslovakia

- Czechoslovak Air Force
- Czechoslovak National Security Guard

Soviet Union

- Soviet Air Forces

== Surviving aircraft ==
Czech Republic

- 77 – La-7 on static display at the Prague Aviation Museum in Kbely, Prague.

Russia

- 27 – La-7 on static display at the Central Air Force Museum in Monino, Moscow. It was flown by Ivan Kozhedub.

== Specifications (1945 production model) ==
Lavochkin La-7

Data from Soviet Airpower in World War 2

General characteristics

- Crew: 1
- Length: 8.6 m (28 ft 3 in)
- Wingspan: 9.8 m (32 ft 2 in)
- Height: 2.54 m (8 ft 4 in)
- Wing area: 17.59 m^{2} (189.3 sq ft)
- Empty weight: 2,638 kg (5,816 lb)
- Gross weight: 3,315 kg (7,308 lb)
- Powerplant: 1 × Shvetsov ASh-82FN 14-cylinder, two-row, air-cooled radial, 1,380 kW (1,850 hp)
- Propellers: 3-bladed VISh-105V-4

Performance

- Maximum speed: 661 km/h (411 mph, 357 kn) at 6,000 m (19,685 ft)
- Range: 665 km (413 mi, 359 nmi) (1944 model)
- Service ceiling: 10,450 m (34,280 ft)
- Rate of climb: 15.7 m/s (3,095 ft/min)
- Time to altitude: 5.3 minutes to 5,000 m (16,404 ft)
- Wing loading: 188 kg/m^{2} (38.6 lb/sq ft)
- Power/mass: 0.41 kW/kg (.25 hp/lb)

Armament

- Guns: 2 × cowl-mounted 20 mm ShVAK cannons with 200 rounds per gun or 3 × cowl-mounted 20 mm Berezin B-20 cannons with 100 rounds per gun
- Bombs: 200 kg (440 lb) of bombs

== See also ==
Aircraft of comparable role, configuration, and era

- Fiat G.55 Centauro
- Focke-Wulf Fw 190
- Hawker Tempest
- Hawker Sea Fury
- Republic P-47 Thunderbolt
- Kawasaki Ki-100
- Yak-3U

Related lists

- List of aircraft of World War II
- List of fighter aircraft
- List of military aircraft of the Soviet Union and the CIS

== Bibliography ==
- Bergström, Christer (2008). Bagration to Berlin: The Final Air Battle in the East 1944–45. Classic Publications. ISBN 978-1-903223-91-8.
- Gordon, Yefim (2003). Lavochkin's Piston-Engined Fighters. Red Star. Vol. 10. Midland Publishing. ISBN 1-85780-151-2.
- Gordon, Yefim (2008). Soviet Airpower in World War 2. Midland Publishing. ISBN 978-1-85780-304-4.
- Gordon, Yefim & Komissarov, Dmitry (2014). Soviet and Russian Military Aircraft in Asia. Hikoki. ISBN 978-1-902-10929-9.
- Gunston, Bill (1995). The Osprey Encyclopedia of Russian Aircraft from 1875–1995. Osprey Aerospace. ISBN 1-85532-405-9.
- Stapfer, Hans-Heiri (1998). La 5/7 Fighters in Action. Aircraft in Action. Vol. 169. Squadron/Signal Publications. ISBN 0-89747-392-2.
- Якубович, Н. В. (2017). Истребитель Ла-7. Гроза реактивных «мессеров» [La-7 Fighter: A Thunderstorm for Jet Messerschmitts] (in Russian). Яуза, ЭКСМО. ISBN 978-5-699-96071-2.
