= Lavochkin La-11 =

Soviet long-range piston-engined fighter aircraft

La-11
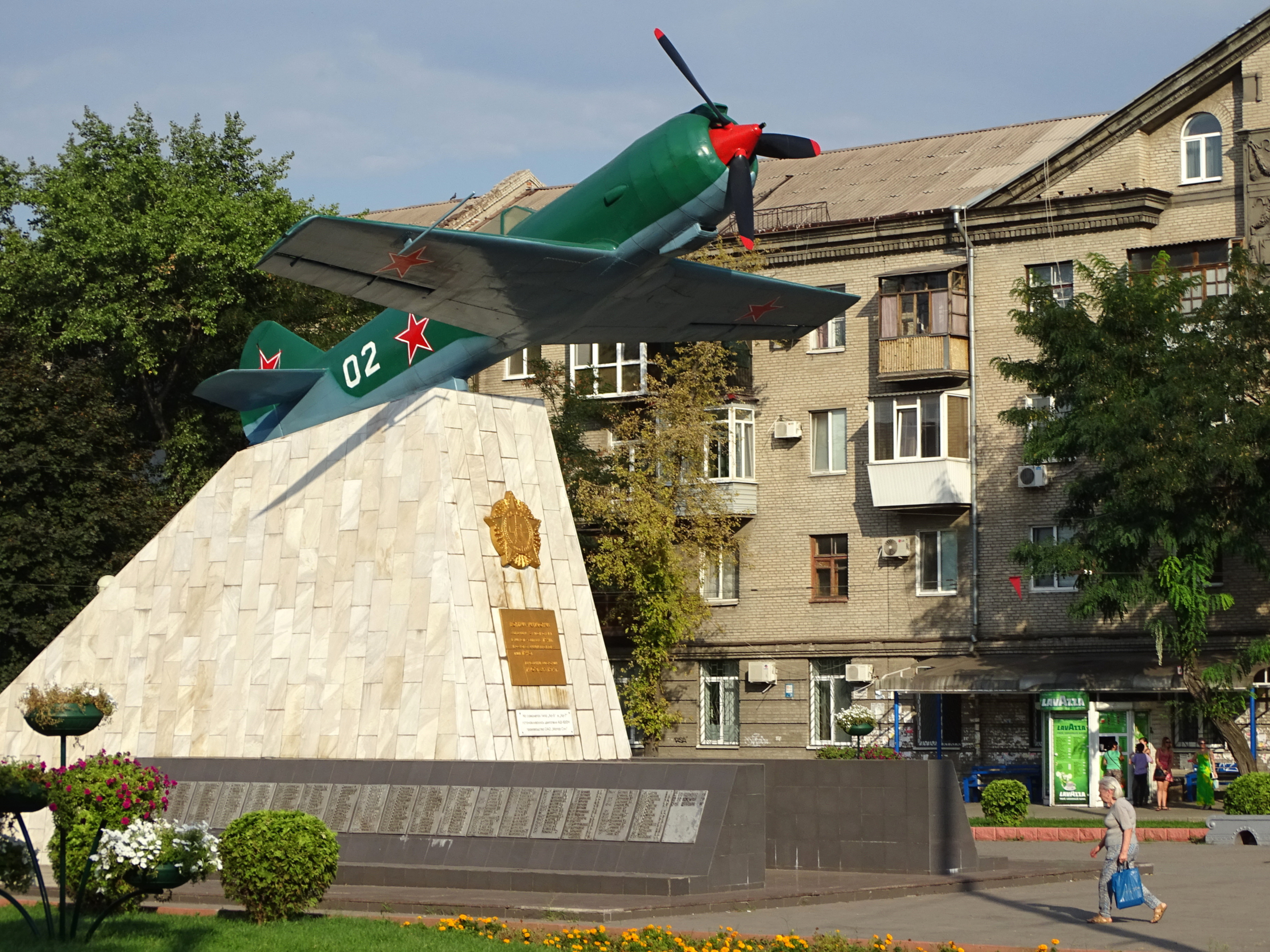
- A La-11 mounted on a memorial in Zaporizhia, Ukraine.

General information
- Type: Fighter
- National origin: Soviet Union
- Manufacturer: Lavochkin
- Primary users: Soviet Air Force People's Liberation Army Air Force
- Number built: 1,232

History
- Manufactured: 1947-1951
- Introduction date: April 1950
- First flight: May 1947
- Retired: 1966 (PLAAF)
- Developed from: Lavochkin La-130

The Lavochkin La-11 (NATO reporting name Fang) is an early post-World War II Soviet long-range piston-engined fighter aircraft. The design was essentially that of a Lavochkin La-9 with additional fuel tanks and the removal of one of the four 23 mm Nudelman-Suranov NS-23 cannons. Like the La-9, the La-11 was designed to be a low to medium-altitude general-purpose fighter, although the additional fuel tanks were added with the intent of employing the La-11 in the escort fighter role.

In reality, the La-11 would go on to serve almost exclusively as an interceptor, with the majority of its engagements during the Korean War seeing it pitted against bomber and transport aircraft. While an improvement over earlier aircraft, the La-9 and La-11 retained the poor high-altitude performance that was common among many Soviet piston-engined airframes, with the La-11 enjoying only a 20 km/h (12 mph) advantage over the Boeing B-29 Superfortress at the latter’s cruising altitude. This relatively poor high-altitude performance combined with the arrival of the jet engine led swiftly to the La-11s (and La-9s) in most frontline Soviet Air Force (VVS) units being replaced with early Soviet jets such as the Mikoyan-Gurevich MiG-15. While quickly ousted from service with the VVS, the La-9 and 11 would both see service well into the 1950s and 1960s with the Chinese People’s Liberation Army Air Force and the North Korean People’s Army Air and Anti-Air Force, with the last La-11s being retired from the former in 1966.

== Development ==
One of the recommendations from the government testing of Lavochkin La-130 (Lavochkin La-9 prototype) was to further develop it into a long-range escort fighter. The resultant La-134 prototype (also sometimes referred to as La-9M) featured increased fuel and oil capacity. Armament was reduced to three cannons. The prototype flew in May 1947. The second prototype, La-134D had fuel capacity increased by an additional 275 L (73 US gal) with wing and external fuel tanks. The aircraft was fitted with larger tires to accommodate the increased weight and amenities for long flights such as increased padding in the seat, armrests, and a urinal. In addition, a full radio navigation suite was installed. Not surprisingly, combat performance with a full fuel load suffered. However, as the fuel load approached that of La-9, so did the performance. The aircraft was found to be poorly suited for combat above 7,000 m (23,000 ft). The new fighter, designated La-11 (OKB designation La-140) entered production in 1947. By the end of production in 1951, a total of 1,182 aircraft were built.

== Operational history ==
The first documented combat use of La-11 took place on April 8, 1950, when four Soviet pilots shot down a United States Navy Consolidated PB4Y-2 Privateer over the Baltic Sea, with all 10 of the Privateer's crew lost. Later the same year, two La-11 pilots shot down a USN Lockheed P2V Neptune over the Sea of Japan near Vladivostok; one USN crew member was killed.

From February 1950, the Soviet 106th Fighter Aviation Division moved to Shanghai to defend it against bombing by the ROCAF. The division included the 351st Fighter Regiment, equipped with the La-11. On March 7, the regiment claimed a North American B-25 Mitchell bomber, shot down near Nanjing. On March 14, 1950, a Martin B-26 Marauder bomber was claimed in Xuzhou. On March 20, 1950, five La-11 pilots encountered a group of North American P-51 Mustangs north-west of Shanghai, although the P-51 pilots immediately retreated. On April 2, 1950, two P-51s were claimed by La-11 pilots over Shanghai. After that, MiG-15s of the Soviet 29th Fighter Regiment took over the air defence role. The ROCAF stopped bombing Shanghai that June and the Soviet units left in October 1950.

By July 1950, La-11s were flying combat air patrol missions over North Korea.

On November 30, 1951, 16 La-11 fighter pilots of the 4th Fighter Aviation Regiment, Chinese People's Volunteer Army (PVA) were escorting 9 Tu-2 PVA bombers to bomb the South Korean island of Taehwa-do (대화도/大和島), in the Pansong archipelago. They were attacked by more than 30 F-86 fighters of the United States Air Force. While PVAF lost 4 bombers, 15 crew, and 3 La-11s to the USAF, this battle also marked the very first propeller fighter victory over jet fighters for the Chinese and Xu Huaitang received a Battle Award, 1st Class for his victory over Taehwa-do Island. The PLAAF claim four F-86s shot down in this engagement, however in reality, no F-86s were lost by the USAF although one was slightly damaged. One MiG-15 was also shot down by the American fighters in this battle.

The main target of La-11 pilots during the Korean War was the Douglas A-26 Invader night bomber, although numerous skirmishes with P-51s also took place. Attempts to intercept Boeing B-29 Superfortress bombers proved fruitless. An La-11 required 26 minutes to reach the B-29's cruising altitude, and, once there, had a speed advantage of only 20 km/h (12 mph).

On July 23, 1954, a Douglas C-54 Skymaster military transport aircraft, registration VR-HEU, operated by Cathay Pacific Airways on a civilian passenger flight en route from Bangkok to Hong Kong, was shot down by two La-11 fighters of the 85th Fighter Regiment, People's Liberation Army Air Force (PLAAF) off the coast of Hainan Island, killing 10 people in an incident that has become known as the 1954 Cathay Pacific Douglas DC-4 shootdown.

Although the four-engined propeller-driven Douglas (registered VR-HEU) was a C-54 Skymaster, the incident is known as "the DC-4 shootdown" because the C-54 is the military version of the Douglas DC-4, and the aircraft was flying a commercial passenger run.

Three days later, near the same location, two La-11s of the same unit were shot down by 2 AD-4 airplanes of the US Navy.

During 1954–55, La-11 fighters of the PLAAF took part in the Battle of Yijiangshan Islands escorting the ships of the People's Liberation Army Navy and Tu-2 bombers.

== Operators ==
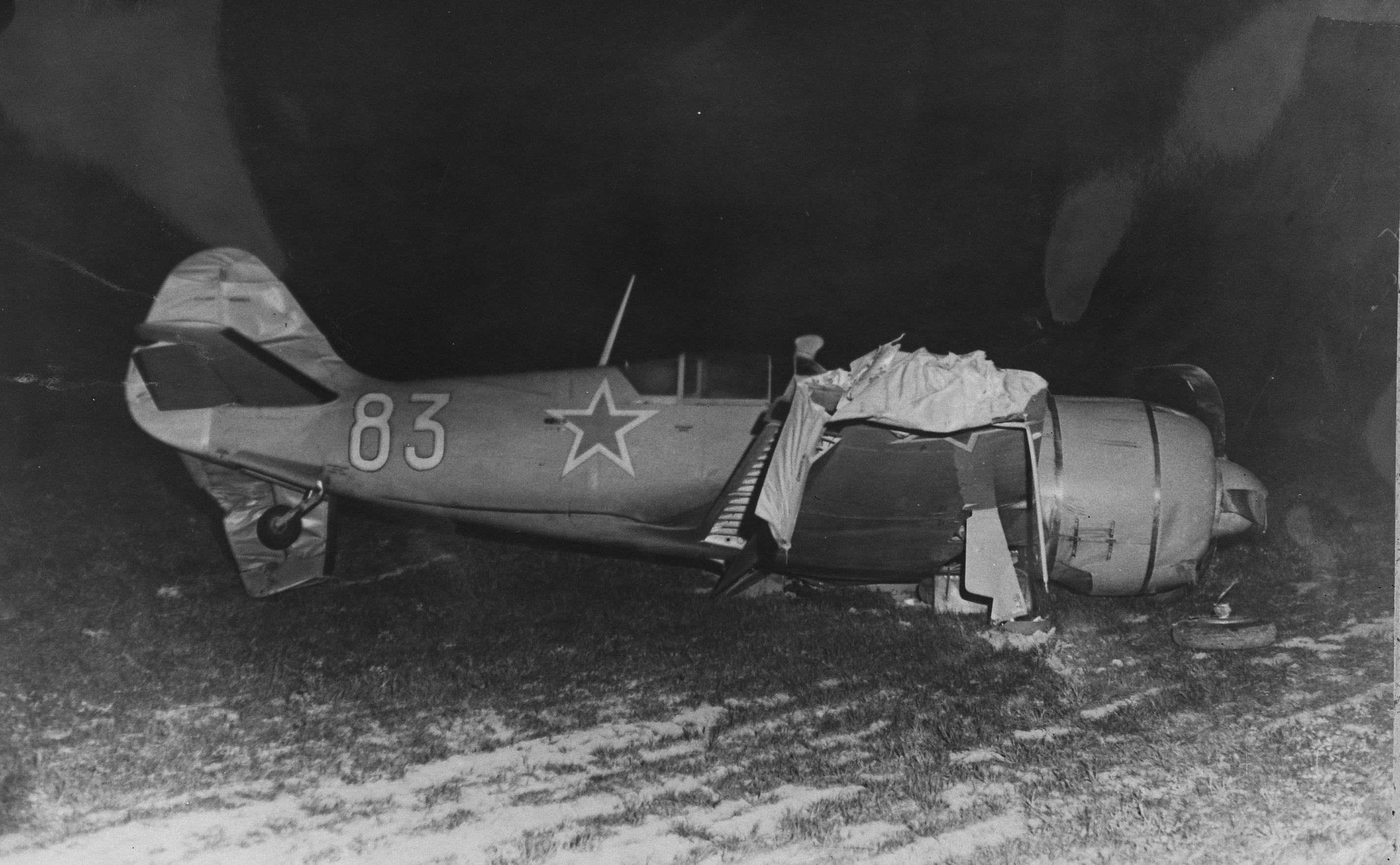
A Soviet Lavochkin La-11 in Sweden, May 1949

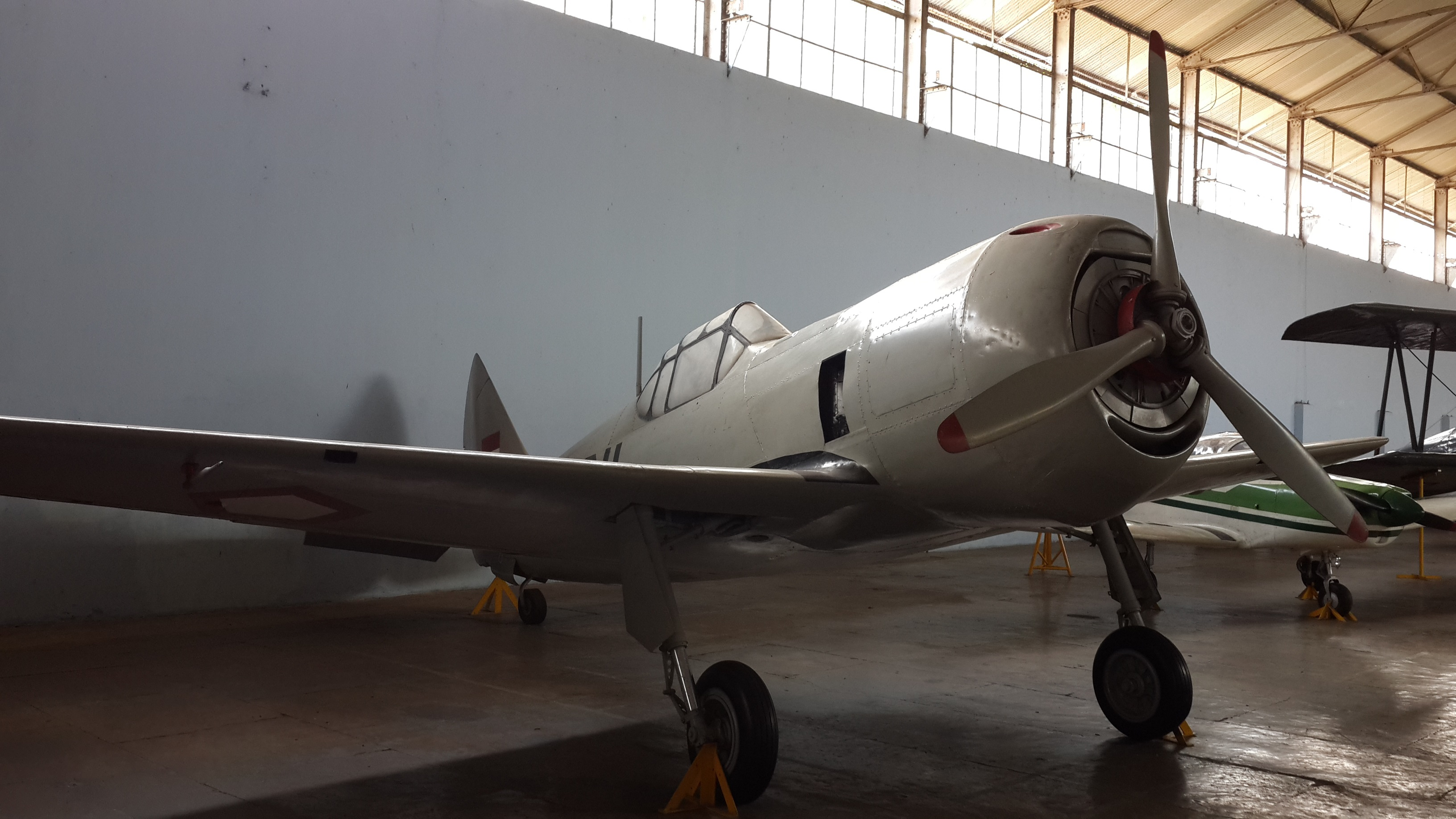
Lavochkin La-11 in the Indonesian Air force Museum, Yogyakarta

Soviet Union

- Soviet Air Force
- Soviet Anti-Air Defence

China

- People's Liberation Army Air Force – Imported 163 La-11 fighters from 1950–1953. The last 18 La-11 airplanes retired in 1966.

North Korea

- North Korean Air Force

Indonesia

- Indonesian Air Force – Received 24 La-11s from China in 1958–1959.

== Surviving aircraft ==
=== China ===
- La-11, on display at Chinese Aviation Museum, Datangshang, China as Red 24
- La-11, on display at Beijing Air and Space Museum, Beijing, China as Red 09

=== Indonesia ===
- La-11 F-911, on display at Dirgantara Mandala Museum, Adisutjipto AB, Yogyakarta

=== Russia ===
- La-11, on display at Nizhny Novgorod Military Museum, Russia

=== United Kingdom ===
- La-11 20, stored pending restoration by The Fighter Collection, Duxford, Cambs

=== United States ===
- La-11 10142/N2276Y, stored pending restoration with Kermit Weeks, Orlampa, Florida

== Specifications (La-11) ==
Data from

General characteristics

- Crew: 1
- Length: 8.62 m (28 ft 3 in)
- Wingspan: 9.8 m (32 ft 2 in)
- Height: 3.47 m (11 ft 5 in)
- Wing area: 17.6 m^{2} (189 sq ft)
- Airfoil: TsAGI Laminar Airfoil
- Empty weight: 2,770 kg (6,107 lb)
- Gross weight: 3,730 kg (8,223 lb)
- Max takeoff weight: 3,996 kg (8,810 lb)
- Powerplant: 1 × Shvetsov ASh-82FN 14-cylinder air-cooled radial piston engine with 2-stage supercharger and fuel injection, 1,380 kW (1,850 hp)
- Propellers: 3-bladed constant-speed propeller

Performance

- Maximum speed: 674 km/h (419 mph, 364 kn) at altitude
- Range: 2,235 km (1,389 mi, 1,207 nmi)
- Service ceiling: 10,250 m (33,630 ft)
- Rate of climb: 12.63 m/s (2,486 ft/min)
- Wing loading: 212 kg/m^{2} (43 lb/sq ft)
- Power/mass: 0.37 kW/kg (0.23 hp/lb)

Armament

- 3 × 23 mm Nudelman-Suranov NS-23 cannon with 75 rpg

== See also ==
Related development

- Lavochkin La-126
- Lavochkin La-9

Related lists

- List of fighter aircraft
