= Lavochkin-Gorbunov-Gudkov LaGG-1 =

Soviet fighter aircraft of WWII

LaGG-1

General information
- Type: Fighter
- National origin: Soviet Union
- Manufacturer: OKB - 301, Khimki, Moscow region
- Designer: V. P. Gorbunov
- Number built: 100

History
- Manufactured: 1940
- First flight: 30 March 1940
- Developed into: Lavochkin-Gorbunov-Gudkov LaGG-3; Lavochkin La-5; Lavochkin La-7

The Lavochkin-Gorbunov-Gudkov LaGG-1 (Russian: Лавочкин-Горбунов-Гудков ЛаГГ-1) was a Soviet fighter aircraft of World War II. Although not very successful, it formed the basis for a series of aircraft that would eventually become some of the most formidable Soviet fighters of the war.

== Design and development ==
The LaGG-1 was designed in 1938 by Semyon Lavochkin, Vladimir P. Gorbunov and Mikhail Gudkov of design bureau OKB-301 in Khimki to the north-west of Moscow. It was designed as a light-weight aircraft around the Klimov M-105 engine and built out of laminated wood to save on strategic materials. The first prototype flew on March 30, 1940, and once some initial difficulties had been worked out of the design, proved to be promising, if somewhat short of what its designers had hoped for. By this stage, however, the need to modernise the Soviet Air Force had been made plain by recent losses in the Winter War with Finland, and the aircraft, initially designated I-22 was ordered into production. Some 100 aircraft were sent to evaluation squadrons, where their shortcomings quickly became obvious. The new fighter proved clearly underpowered. It lacked agility and range. Furthermore, while the prototypes were carefully handmade and finished, the mass-produced examples were comparatively crude.

The subsequent modifications undertaken by Lavochkin's OKB would result at last in the LaGG-3.

== Operators ==
Soviet Union

- Soviet Air Forces

== Specifications (LaGG-1) ==
Data from The Complete Book of Fighters

General characteristics

- Crew: 1
- Length: 8.81 m (28 ft 11 in)
- Wingspan: 9.8 m (32 ft 2 in)
- Height: 4.4 m (14 ft 5 in)
- Wing area: 17.5 m^{2} (188 sq ft)
- Empty weight: 2,968 kg (6,543 lb)
- Gross weight: 2,968 kg (6,543 lb)
- Max takeoff weight: 3,380 kg (7,452 lb)
- Fuel capacity: 250 kg (550 lb) (fuel and oil)
- Powerplant: 1 × Klimov M-105P V-12 liquid-cooled piston engine, 820 kW (1,100 hp)
- Propellers: 2-bladed VISh-61P variable-pitch propeller, 3 m (9 ft 10 in) diameter

Performance

- Maximum speed: 500 km/h (310 mph, 270 kn) at sea level; 600 km/h (370 mph; 320 kn) at 5,000 m (16,000 ft)
- Range: 556 km (345 mi, 300 nmi)
- Service ceiling: 9,600 m (31,500 ft)
- Rate of climb: 14.3 m/s (2,810 ft/min)
- Time to altitude: 5,000 m (16,000 ft) in 6.2 minutes
- Wing loading: 170 kg/m^{2} (35 lb/sq ft)
- Power/mass: 0.270 kW/kg (0.17 hp/lb)

Armament

- Guns: * 1 × 20 mm (0.787 in) ShVAK cannon
- 2 × 7.62 mm (0.300 in) ShKAS machine-guns

== See also ==
Related development

- Lavochkin-Gorbunov-Gudkov LaGG-3
- Lavochkin La-5
- Lavochkin La-7

Aircraft of comparable role, configuration, and era

- Curtiss P-40 Warhawk
- Kawasaki Ki-61
- Messerschmitt Bf 109
- Supermarine Spitfire

Related lists

- List of military aircraft of the Soviet Union and the CIS
- List of fighter aircraft
- List of aircraft of World War II
