= Shvetsov ASh-82 =

Soviet aircraft engine

ASh-82
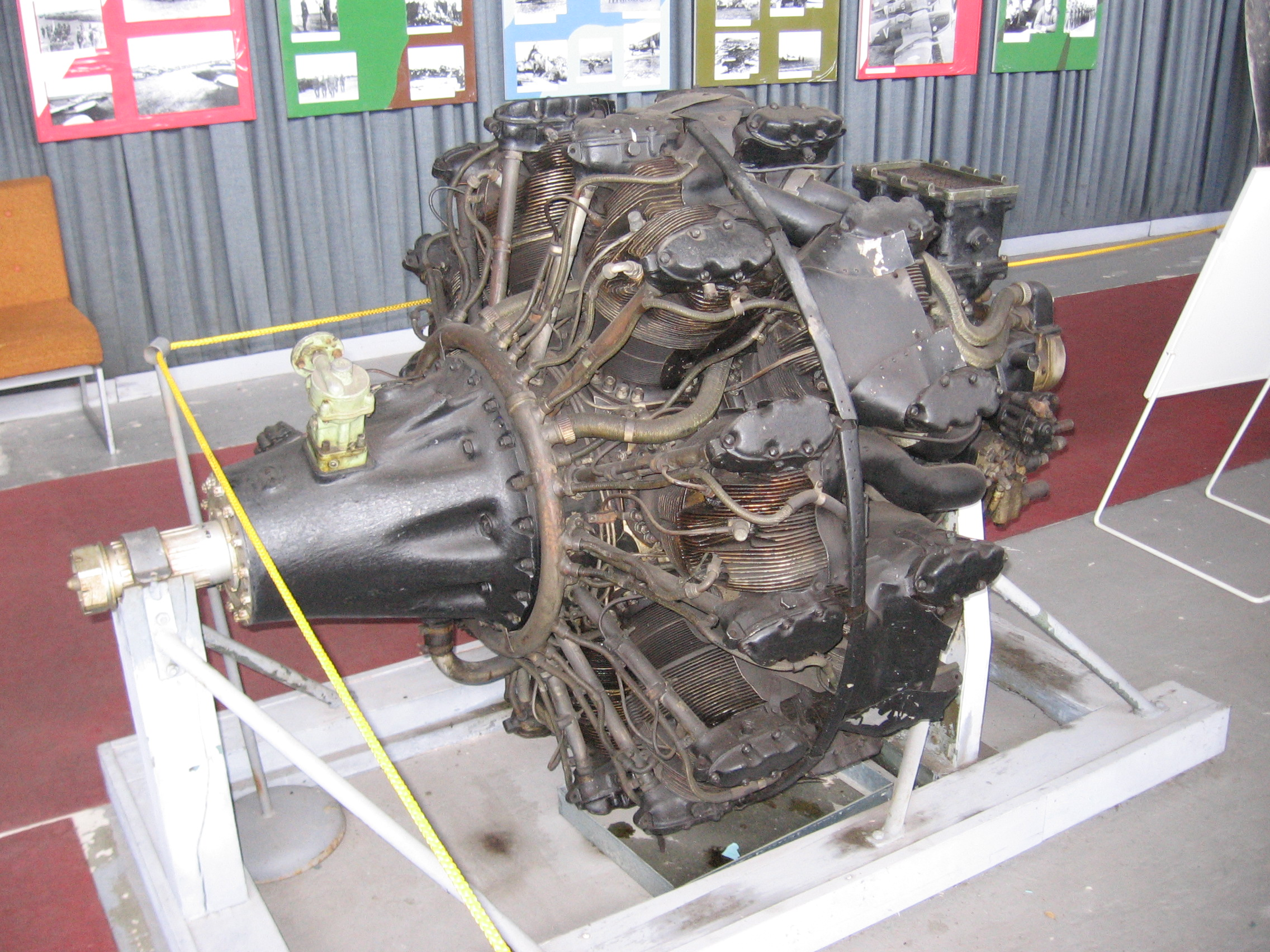
- Preserved Shvetsov ASh-82 at the Prague Aviation Museum, Kbely
- Type: Radial engine
- National origin: Soviet Union
- Manufacturer: Shvetsov & Evich, OKB-19 in Perm'
- First run: 1940
- Major applications: Lavochkin La-5; Mil Mi-4; Petlyakov Pe-8; Polikarpov I-185; Sukhoi Su-2
- Number built: 70,000 (57,898 of Ash-82, 82F & 82FN in wartime)
- Developed from: Shvetsov M-62
- Developed into: Shvetsov ASh-21

The Shvetsov ASh-82 (Russian: Швецов АШ-82), also known as the M-82, is a Soviet 14-cylinder, two-row, air-cooled radial aircraft engine developed from the Shvetsov M-62, which in turn was the result of development of the M-25, a licensed version of the Wright R-1820 Cyclone.

== Design and development ==
Arkadiy Shvetsov re-engineered the Wright Cyclone design, through the OKB-19 design bureau he headed, for Russian aviation engine manufacturing practices and metric dimensions and fasteners, reducing the stroke, dimensions and weight. This allowed the engine to be used in light aircraft, where an American-design Twin Cyclone, of some 930 kg (2,045 lb) weight in "dry" condition could not be installed.

The engine entered production in 1940 and saw service in a number of Soviet aircraft. It powered the Tupolev Tu-2 and Pe-8 bombers and the Ilyushin Il-14 airliner. The inline engine-powered LaGG-3 fighter was adapted for the ASh-82 producing the famous Lavochkin La-5 fighter and its derivatives, Lavochkin La-7, La-9 & La-11. Over 70,000 ASh-82s were built. They were built in the 1950s to 1960s era under licence, both in Czechoslovakia (as the M-82) by the Walter (Motorlet) factory in Prague-Jinonice and in the German Democratic Republic by the VEB Industriewerke Karl-Marx-Stadt.

== Variants ==
ASh-82-111 (M-82-111)
First mass-produced ASh-82, with carburettors and one two-speed supercharger. Engine had lubrication and carburettor problems in harsh winter conditions.

ASh-82-112 (M-82-112)
Improved M-82-111 with longer Time between overhaul (TBO) and better reliability. Redesigned carburettors, oil pumps, gear, turbocharger and reinforced pushrods.

ASh-82F (M-82F)
Identical to ASh-82 except for longer Time between overhaul and improved cooling and lubrication system.

ASh-82FNV (M-82FNV)
Improved M-82F with direct fuel injection, power output increased to 1,380 kW (1,850 hp) compared to the 1,268 kW (1,700 hp) of the M-82 and M-82F.

ASh-82FN (M-82FN)
Series production M-82FNV, used by Pe-8 long-range bombers and Lavochkin La-5FN and La-7 fighters.

ASh-21 (M-21)
Single-row 7-cylinder version of ASh-82 for Yakovlev Yak-11 trainer, entered production in 1946, used also to power e.g. the Mil Mi-1 helicopter.

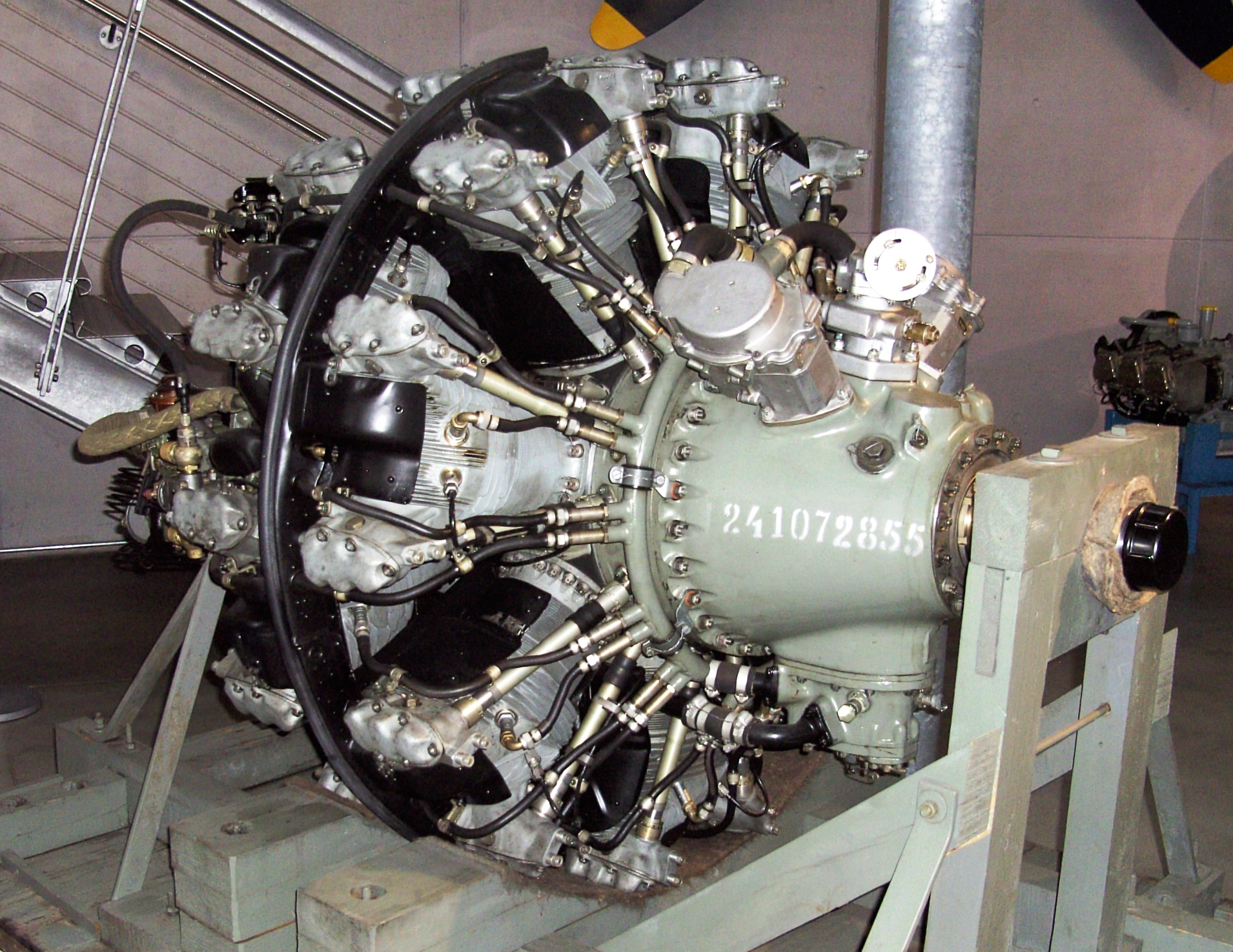
ASh-82T aircraft engine. The black metal plates mid-engine are baffles that re-direct airflow from the front of the engine (on the right in this image) over the heads of the cylinders.

ASh-82T (M-82T)
New version of the ASh-82FNV developed in the early fifties for civilian aircraft. Previous version twin superchargers were replaced with a large single-speed compressor attached to an after-cooler (the critical altitude was 2,000 m, 6,561 ft). New alloys were used and some components were upgraded, thus reducing maintenance operations. Special care was put into reducing the engine noise level and an optional exhaust double silencer was available. The engine had a new fuel injection system and improved specific fuel consumption.

A four-blade high efficiency propeller, the Typ AV-50m, was developed for the 82T version. Take-off power was 1,900 hp (1,417 kW) at 2,600 RPM, with 95 octane Avgas. Maximum continuous power was 1,630 hp (1,215 kW). At 85 octane Avgas and minor modifications, power output was rated at 1,700 hp (1,268 kW).

ASh-82V (M-82V)
Helicopter version of the ASh-82T developed in 1952, with axial-flow fan mounted in the fuselage's front. The engine was connected to a R-5 two-stage planetary primary gearbox with the help of a shaft (which was between the pilots seats). This engine was used in the Mi-4 and Yak-24 helicopters.

ASh-2TK and ASh-2K (ASh-4K)
Four-row versions of the ASh-82, developed in the late '40s. The ASh-2TK had a two-stage two-speed supercharging system with intercooler (similar to the ASh-73) that compromised the engine's long TBO. Finally the ASh-2TK was discarded and a new version was developed, the ASh-4K, with an experimental variable-speed turbocharger and after-cooler, which allowed a cruising altitude of 11,000 m (36,089 ft). The engine had 82.4 litres (5,030 cu in) and 4,000 HP (2,985 kW) at 2,600 RPM (dry). The Ash-2K (ASh-4K) version had 4,700 HP (3,507 kW) wet, with a water-methanol system.

For political reasons, these engines were prematurely installed in Tupolev Tu-4LL testbeds at the end of 1950, when the prototypes' initial tests had barely begun. The engines had various teething and overheating problems, and required a long testing period. Most of the flaws were fixed in the mid-fifties, but the production was cancelled: in those days, the priority for the Soviet Air Force were the turboprop and jet engines.

Dongan HS-7
A Chinese license built copy of the ASh-82FN, and the chosen engine for powering modern 21st century reproductions of the Focke-Wulf Fw 190A.

Dongan HS-8
A modified version of the Dongan HS-7 which "combined the main body and supercharger of the HS-7 with the reduction gear and propeller drive of the Shvetsov ASh-82T". Built by Dongan Engine Manufacturing Company (aka Harbin Engine Factory).

== Applications ==
Family tree of Shvetsov engines

- Amtorg KM-2 (Improved PBY Catalina, built under Consolidated license)
- Douglas TS-82
- Gudkov Gu-82 (Prototype)
- Ilyushin Il-2 (prototype)
- Ilyushin Il-12
- Ilyushin Il-14
- Kocherigin OPB-5 (prototype)
- Lisunov Li-2
- Lavochkin La-5
- Lavochkin La-7
- Lavochkin La-9
- Lavochkin La-11
- MiG-5
- MiG-9 I-210 (1941 Prototype)
- Mikoyan-Gurevich I-211 prototype
- Mil Mi-4
- Petlyakov Pe-2
- Petlyakov Pe-8
- Polikarpov I-185 (Prototype)
- Sukhoi Su-2
- Sukhoi Su-4
- Sukhoi Su-7
- Sukhoi Su-12
- Tupolev Tu-2
- Yakovlev Yak-24
- Yakovlev Yak-3 (Yak-3U variant)

== Specifications (ASh-82T) ==
Data from

=== General characteristics ===
- Type: 14-cylinder two-row radial engine
- Bore: 155.5 mm (6.122 in)
- Stroke: 155 mm (6.102 in)
- Displacement: 41.2107 L (2,514.83 cu in)
- Length: 2,100 mm (82.7 in)
- Diameter: 1,260 mm (49.6 in)
- Dry weight: 1,020 kg (2,250 lb)

=== Components ===
- Valvetrain: Pushrod, two valves per cylinder with sodium-cooled exhaust valve.
- Supercharger: Single-speed centrifugal supercharger with after-cooler.
- Fuel system: Direct fuel injection with automatic mixture control
- Fuel type: 90 to 100 octane petrol
- Oil system: Pressure fed with two pumps
- Reduction gear: 9:16

=== Performance ===
- Power output:
- 1,400 kW (1,900 hp) at 2,600 rpm for take-off, boost rated at 1.64 atm (49 inHg)
- 1,220 kW (1,630 hp) 2,400 rpm at 2,000 m (6,600 ft), boost rated at 1.34 atm (40 inHg)
- 1,140 kW (1,530 hp) at 2,400 rpm at 4,000 m (13,000 ft), boost rated at 1.34 atm (40 inHg)
- 538 kW (721 hp) at 2,400 rpm at 9,500 m (31,200 ft)
- Compression ratio: 6.9:1
- Specific fuel consumption:
- Take-off:0.46–0.43 kg/kWh (0.76–0.71 lb/(hp⋅h))
- Cruise:0.346–0.372 kg/kWh (0.568–0.611 lb/(hp⋅h))
- Power-to-weight ratio: 1.46 kW/kg (0.89 hp/lb)

== See also ==
Comparable engines

- BMW 801
- Gnome-Rhône 14R
- Nakajima Mamoru
- Wright R-2600 Twin Cyclone

Related lists

- List of aircraft engines
