= Lavochkin La-9 =

Soviet fighter aircraft in service 1946-1959

La-9
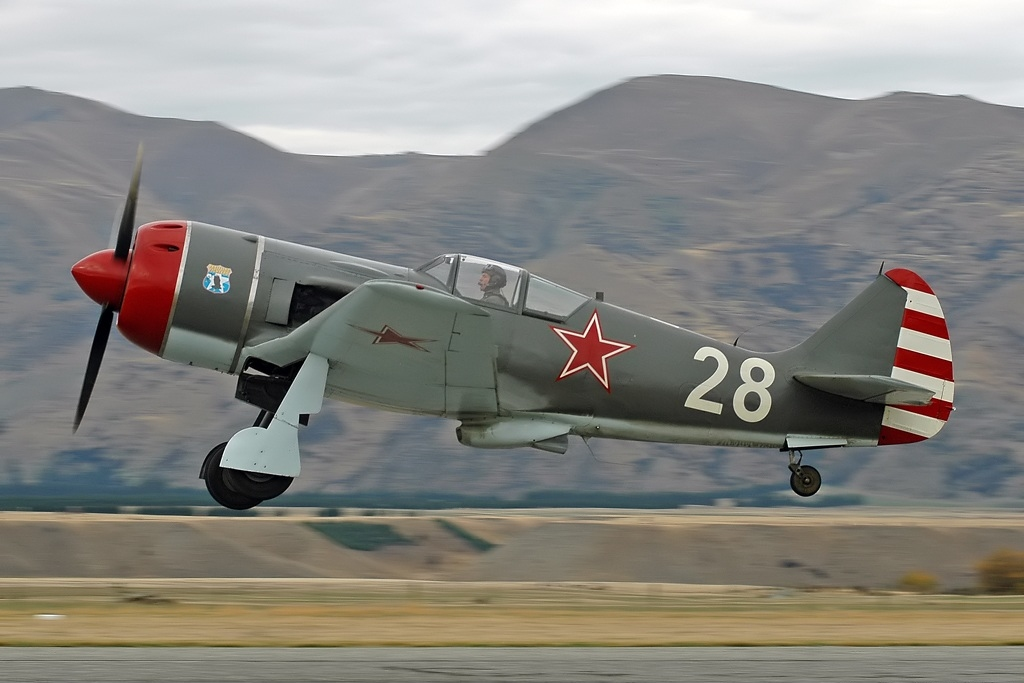

General information
- Type: Fighter
- Manufacturer: Lavochkin
- Status: Phased out of service
- Primary users: Soviet Air Force Romanian Air Force; North Korea Air Force
- Number built: 1,559

History
- Manufactured: 1946–1948
- Introduction date: August 1946
- First flight: 1946
- Developed from: Lavochkin La-126
- Developed into: Lavochkin La-11

The Lavochkin La-9 (NATO reporting name Fritz) is a Soviet fighter aircraft produced shortly after World War II. It was one of the last piston engined fighters to be produced before the widespread adoption of the jet engine.

== Development ==
La-9 represents a further development of the Lavochkin La-126 prototype. The first prototype, designated La-130 was finished in 1946. Similarity to the famous Lavochkin La-7 was only superficial – the new fighter had an all-metal construction and a laminar flow wing. Weight savings due to elimination of wood from the airframe allowed for greatly improved fuel capacity and four-cannon armament. Mock combat demonstrated that the La-130 was evenly matched with the La-7 but was inferior to the Yakovlev Yak-3 in horizontal planes. The new fighter, officially designated La-9, entered production in August 1946. A total of 1,559 aircraft were built by the end of production in 1948.

== Variants ==
Like other aircraft designers at the time, Lavochkin was experimenting with using jet propulsion to augment performance of piston-engined fighters. One such attempt was La-130R with an RD-1Kh3 liquid fuel rocket engine in addition to the Shvetsov ASh-82FN piston powerplant. The project was cancelled in 1946 before the prototype could be assembled. A more unusual approach was La-9RD which was tested in 1947–1948. It was a production La-9 with a reinforced airframe and armament reduced to two cannons, which carried a single RD-13 pulsejet (the engine which powered the V-1 flying bomb, probably taken from surplus Luftwaffe stocks) under each wing. The 70 km/h (45 mph) increase in top speed came at the expense of tremendous noise and vibration. The engines were unreliable and worsened the handling. The project was abandoned although between 3 and 9 La-9RD were reported to perform at airshows, no doubt pleasing the crowds with the noise.

Other notable La-9 variants were:

- La-9UTI – two-seat trainer version. Built at GAZ-99 in Ulan-Ude. Two versions exist: with 12.7 mm UBS machine gun and with one 23 mm NS-23 cannon (all armament is mounted in the cowling above the engine, firing through the propeller).
- La-132 (La-132) – prototype with upgraded Shvetsov M-93 engine. Projected top speed 740 km/h (460 mph) at 6,500 m (21,325 ft). Engine proved a failure and the single prototype was equipped with an experimental Shvetsov ASh-82M instead. The aircraft did not proceed to production.
- La-9M (La-134) – long-range fighter prototype, see Lavochkin La-11
- La-9RD – one La-9 was fitted with two auxiliary RD-13 pulsejet engines underwing.
- La-138 – one La-9 was fitted with two underwing PVRD-450 auxiliary ramjet engines.

== Operators ==
China

- People's Liberation Army Air Force Imported 129 La-9 airplanes in 1950. The last 5 La-9 fighters retired in 1959.

East Germany

- Volkspolizei (5 operated from 1952 to 1956 prior to the formation of the Air Forces of the National People's Army)

North Korea

- North Korea Air Force

Romania

- Romanian Air Force (10 delivered in 1950: 5 La-9 and 5 La-9 UTI)

Soviet Union

- Soviet Air Force
- Soviet Air Defence Forces

== Surviving aircraft ==
=== China ===
- La-9 6201 is on display at Beijing Aeronautical Institute, Beijing, China as 7504
- La-9 (unidentified S/N) on display at People's Liberation Army Air Force Museum, Datangshan, Chiangping, China as 06
- La-9UTI (unidentified S/N) on display at People's Liberation Army Air Force Museum, Datangshan, Chiangping, China

=== North Korea ===
- La-9 102 is on display at Glorious Fatherland Liberation War Museum, Pyongyang, North Korea

=== Romania ===
- La-9 66 on display at Central Military Museum, Bucharest, Romania

=== United States ===
- La-9 28 owned by Jerry Yagen's Military Aviation Museum and restored by Pioneer Aero Restorations in New Zealand between 2001 and 2003, airworthy as N415ML

== Specifications (La-9) ==
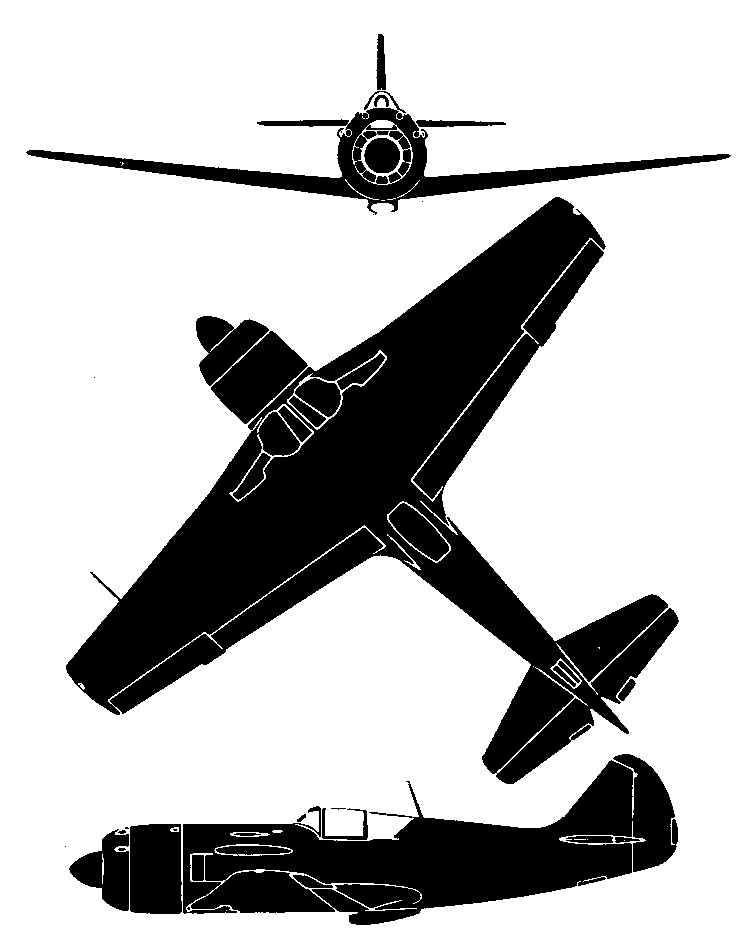
3-view drawing of Lavochkin La-9

Data from

General characteristics

- Crew: 1
- Length: 8.63 m (28 ft 4 in)
- Wingspan: 9.8 m (32 ft 2 in)
- Height: 3.56 m (11 ft 8 in)
- Wing area: 17.6 m^{2} (189 sq ft)
- Aspect ratio: 5.46
- Airfoil: TsAGI Laminar Airfoil
- Empty weight: 2,638 kg (5,816 lb)
- Gross weight: 3,425 kg (7,551 lb)
- Max takeoff weight: 3,676 kg (8,104 lb)
- Powerplant: 1 × Shvetsov ASh-82FN 14-cylinder air-cooled radial piston engine, 1,380 kW (1,850 hp) with 1-stage 2-speed supercharger and fuel injection
- Propellers: 3-bladed constant-speed propeller

Performance

- Maximum speed: 690 km/h (430 mph, 370 kn) at altitude
- Range: 1,735 km (1,078 mi, 937 nmi)
- Service ceiling: 10,800 m (35,400 ft)
- Rate of climb: 17.7 m/s (3,480 ft/min)
- Wing loading: 150 kg/m^{2} (31 lb/sq ft)
- Power/mass: 0.40 kW/kg (0.24 hp/lb)

Armament

- Guns: 4 × 23 mm Nudelman-Suranov NS-23 cannon, 75 rpg

== See also ==
Related development

- La-126
- La-134
- La-11

Aircraft of comparable role, configuration, and era

- Grumman F8F Bearcat
- Hawker Sea Fury
- Hispano Aviación HA-1112
- Nakajima Ki-84
- Kawasaki Ki-100
- North American P-51 Mustang
- Vought F4U Corsair

Related lists

- List of fighter aircraft
