= Lavochkin La-5 =

Soviet fighter aircraft

La-5
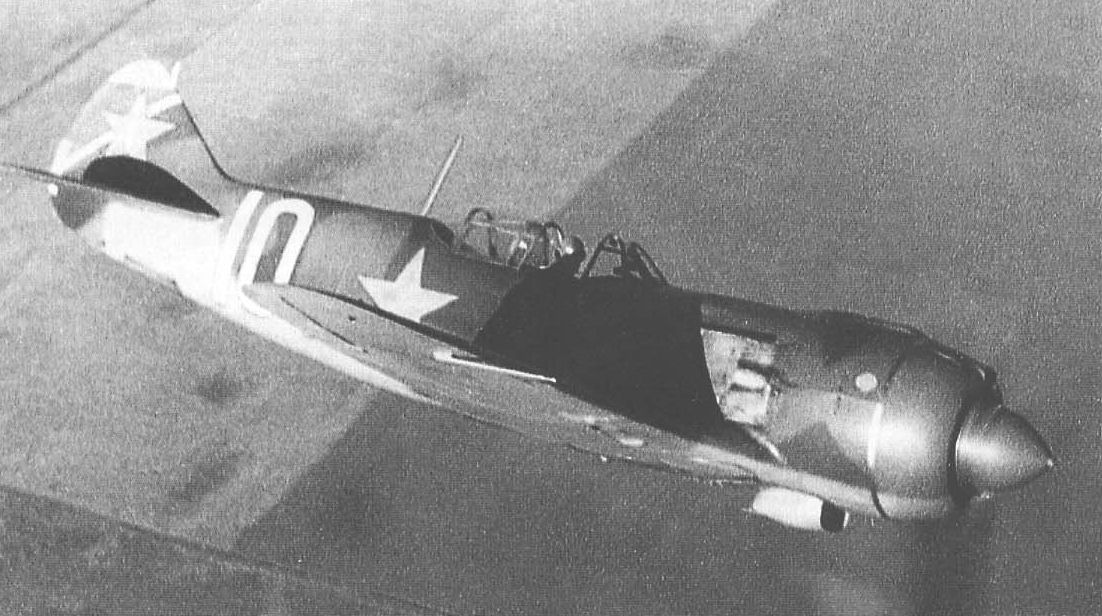
- Lavochkin La-5F

General information
- Type: Fighter aircraft
- National origin: Soviet Union
- Manufacturer: Lavochkin
- Designer: Semyon Lavochkin
- Primary user: Soviet Air Force
- Number built: 9,920

History
- Introduction date: July 1942
- First flight: March 1942
- Developed from: LaGG-3
- Developed into: Lavochkin La-7

The Lavochkin La-5 (Лавочкин Ла-5) was a Soviet fighter aircraft of World War II. It was a development and refinement of the LaGG-3, replacing the earlier model's inline engine with the much more powerful Shvetsov ASh-82 radial engine. During its time in service, it was one of the Soviet Air Force's most capable types of warplane, able to fight German designs on almost equal footing.

== Development ==
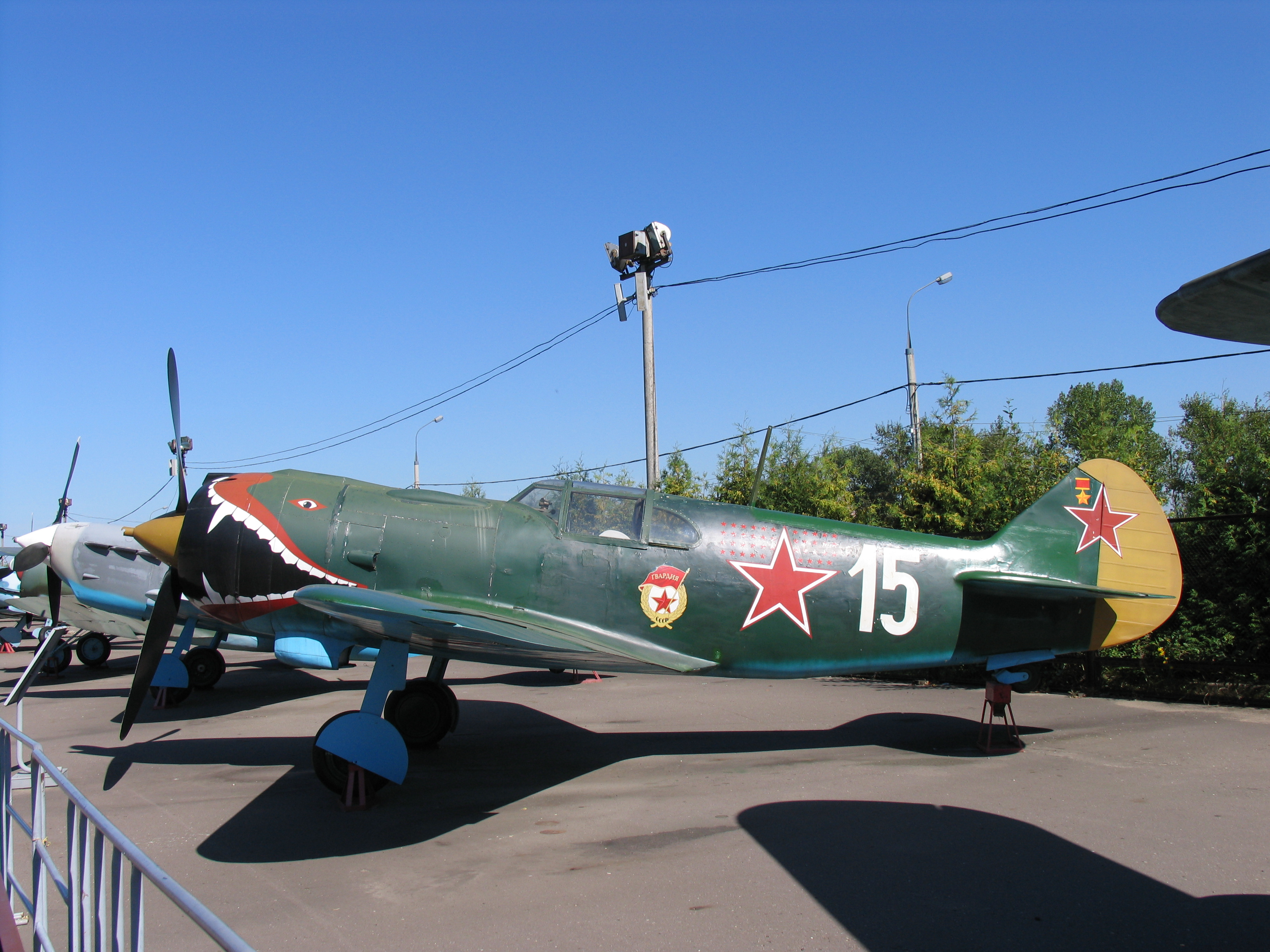
Replica of Capt. Georgii Dmitrievich Kostylev's La-5 of the 4th Guards Fighter Aviation Regiment, White 15 that served in Leningrad 1943, at the Museum of the Great Patriotic War in Moscow, 2005.

The La-5 descended from the LaGG-1 and LaGG-3, aircraft designed by Vladimir Gorbunov before the Second World War. The LaGG-1 was underpowered, and the LaGG-3 - with a lighter airframe and a stronger engine did not solve the problem. By early 1942, the LaGG-3's shortcomings led to Lavochkin falling out of Joseph Stalin's favour, and LaGG-3 factories converting to Yakovlev Yak-1 and Yak-7 production.

During the winter of 1941–1942, Lavochkin worked unofficially to improve the LaGG-3. Design work was conducted in a small hut beside an airfield. In early 1942, Gorbunov replaced a LaGG-3's inline engine with the stronger Shvetsov ASh-82 radial engine. The nose was replaced with the nose of the ASh-82-powered Sukhoi Su-2. The new engine required work to maintain the aircraft's balance. The prototype first flew in March, and demonstrated surprisingly acceptable performance; air force test pilots considered it to be superior to the Yak-7, and intensive flight tests began in April. The aircraft was named LaG-5; the change from LaGG was because Mikhail Gudkov, one of the original LaGG designers, was no longer with the programme. By July, it was called La-5, although Gorbunov was still involved.

By July, the La-5 was ordered into full production, including the conversion of incomplete LaGG-3 airframes. Production based on the prototype began almost immediately in factories in Moscow and the Yaroslav region. Changes to the main production model included slats to improve all-round performance. The La-5 was inferior to the best German fighters at higher altitudes, but equal at lower altitudes; it was suitable for air combat over the Eastern Front which typically took place at altitudes under 5,000 m (16,404 ft).

The aircraft received further modifications. The La-5F improved the pilot's exterior visibility with a cut down rear fuselage. The definitive La-5FN had a fuel-injected engine, a different engine air intake, and was further lightened. A full circle turn took 18–19 seconds. Very late-production La-5FN had two 20mm Berezin B-20 cannon installed in the cowling in place of the heavier two 20mm ShVAK; both were capable of a salvo weight of 3.4 kg/s.

9,920 La-5s of all variants were built, including dedicated trainer versions, designated La-5UTI.

The La-5 was the basis for the further improved Lavochkin La-7.

A number of La-5s continued in the service of Eastern Bloc nations after the end of the war, including Czechoslovakia.

== Performance ==
In mid-1943, a new La-5 was captured by the Germans after making a forced landing at a German airfield. The aircraft was assessed by Luftwaffe test pilot Hans-Werner Lerche. Lerche noted that the La-5FN excelled at altitudes below 3,000 m (9,843 ft) but suffered from short range and flight time of only 40 minutes at cruise engine power. All of the engine controls (throttle, mixture, propeller pitch, cowl flaps, and supercharger gearbox) had separate levers which forced the pilot to make constant adjustments during combat or risk suboptimal performance. For example, rapid acceleration required moving no less than six levers. In contrast, contemporary German aircraft with the BMW 801 used the Kommandogerät engine computer system that automatically controlled all of these settings from a single throttle lever. Due to airflow limitations, the engine boost system (Forsazh) could not be used above 2,000 m (6,562 ft). Stability in all axes was generally good. The authority of the ailerons was deemed exceptional but the rudder was insufficiently powerful at lower speeds. At speeds in excess of 600 km/h (370 mph), the forces on control surfaces became excessive. Horizontal turn time at 1,000 m (3,281 ft) and maximum engine power was 25 seconds.

The La-5's top speed and acceleration were comparable to Luftwaffe fighters at low altitude. The La-5FN roll rate was slightly higher than the Messerschmitt Bf 109; the Bf 109 was slightly faster, and had higher climb and turn rates. The La-5FN climbed slightly faster and had a smaller turn radius than the Focke-Wulf Fw 190A-8. However, the Fw 190A-8 was faster at all altitudes and had significantly better dive performance and a superior roll-rate. Lerche advised Fw 190 pilots to draw the La-5FN to higher altitudes, escape attacks by diving followed by a high-speed shallow climb, and avoid prolonged turning engagements.

The most serious La-5 defects were the engine's thermal isolation, lack of cockpit ventilation, and a canopy that was impossible to open at speeds over 350 km/h. Furthermore, poor engine compartment insulation allowed exhaust gas to enter the cockpit; in response, pilots frequently ignored orders by flying with open canopies.

Soviet pilots were generally satisfied with the La-5. "That was an excellent fighter with two cannons and a powerful air-cooled engine", recalled pilot Viktor M. Sinaisky. "The first La-5s from the Tbilisi factory were slightly inferior, while the last ones from the Gorki plant, which came to us from Ivanovo, were perfect. At first we received regular La-5s, but then we got new ones containing the ASh-82FN engine with direct injection of fuel into the cylinders. It was perfected and had better maneuverability, acceleration, speed and climb rate compared to the early variants. Everyone was in love with the La-5. It was easy to maintain, too."

Nevertheless, La-5 losses were high, the highest of all fighters in service in USSR, excepting those of the Yak-1. In 1941–45, VVS KA lost 2,591 La-5s: 73 in 1942, 1,460 in 1943, 825 the following year, and 233 in 1945.

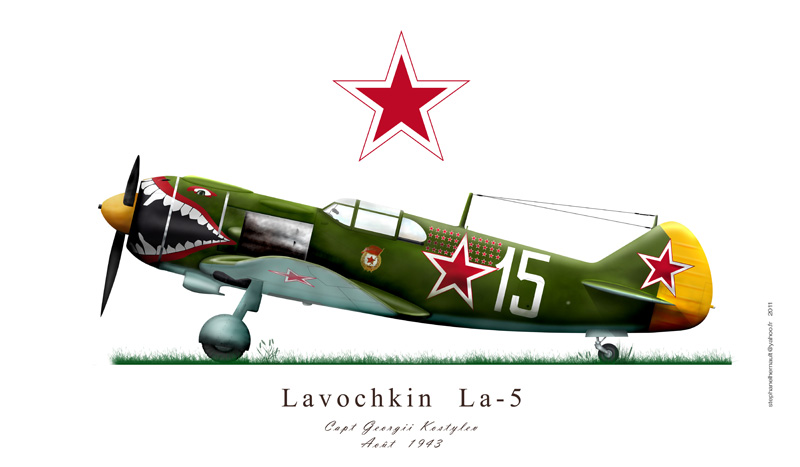
La-5

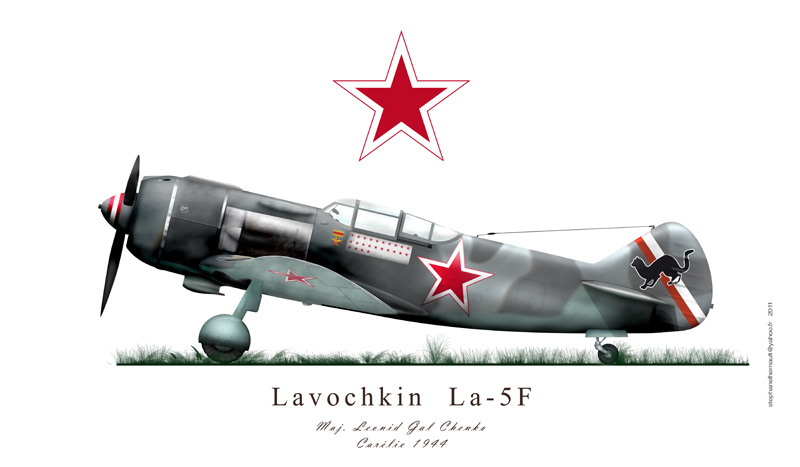
La-5F

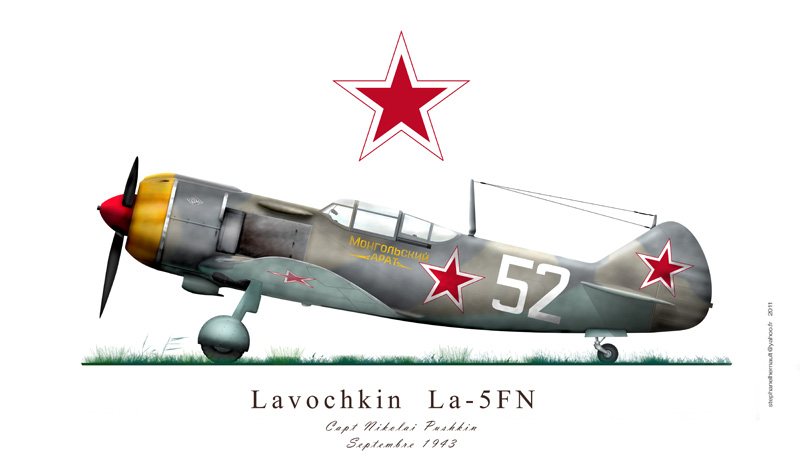
La-5FN

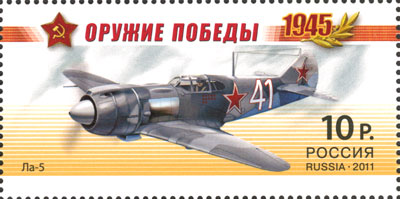
La-5 on Russian stamp

== Operational history ==
The La-5F arrived at the frontline in February 1943. It was able to challenge the Bf 109G-2 and the Fw 190A-4 on more or less equal terms, while at tree-top height it was even faster. One of the most successful La-5 units was 5th Guards Fighter Aviation Regiment, that flew 3,802 combat sorties, claiming 128 enemy aircraft shot down while losing 52 Lavochkins.

== Operators ==
Czechoslovakia

- Czechoslovak Air Force like S-95
- Czechoslovak National Security Guard

Mongolia

- Mongolian People's Army Air Force

Poland

- Polish Air Force – One aircraft only.

Soviet Union

- Soviet Air Force

== Surviving aircraft ==
An La-5 wreck is in storage at the Military Aviation Museum in Virginia Beach, Virginia.

== Specifications (Lavochkin La-5FN) ==
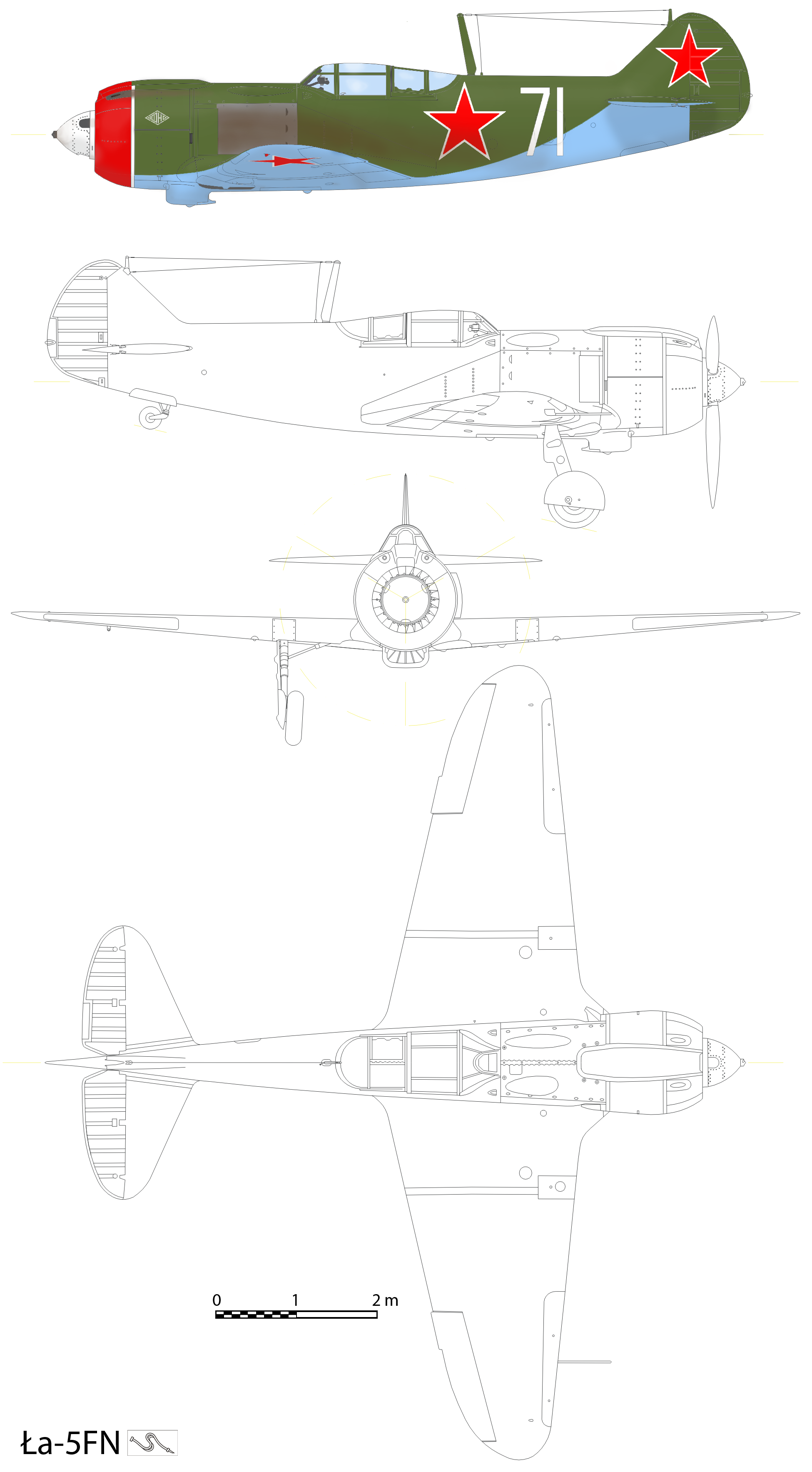
Lavochkin La-5

Data from Istoriia konstruktskii samoletov v SSSR, 1938–1950, Jane's Fighting Aircraft of World War II

General characteristics

- Crew: One
- Length: 8.67 m (28 ft 5 in)
- Wingspan: 9.8 m (32 ft 2 in)
- Height: 2.54 m (8 ft 4 in)
- Wing area: 17.5 m^{2} (188 sq ft)
- Airfoil: root: NACA 23016; tip: NACA 23010
- Empty weight: 2,706 kg (5,966 lb)
- Gross weight: 3,168 kg (6,984 lb)
- Max takeoff weight: 3,402 kg (7,500 lb)
- Fuel capacity: 345 kg (761 lb) fuel + 50 kg (110 lb) oil
- Powerplant: 1 × Shvetsov M-82FN 14-cylinder air-cooled radial piston engine, 1,460 kW (1,960 hp)
- Propellers: 3-bladed constant-speed propeller

Performance

- Maximum speed: 648 km/h (403 mph, 350 kn) at 6,250 m (20,510 ft)

583 km/h (362 mph; 315 kn) at sea level

- Landing speed: 138 km/h (86 mph; 75 kn)
- Range: 765 km (475 mi, 413 nmi)
- Service ceiling: 11,000 m (36,000 ft)
- Rate of climb: 16.7 m/s (3,290 ft/min)
- Time to altitude: 5,000 m (16,000 ft) in 5 minutes 12 seconds
- Wing loading: 181 kg/m^{2} (37 lb/sq ft)
- Power/mass: 0.461 kW/kg (0.280 hp/lb)
- Max rate turn: 18.5 seconds

Armament

- Guns: 2 × 20 mm (0.787 in) ShVAK cannon with 170 rpg
- Bombs: 2 × bombs up to 100 kg (220 lb) each

== See also ==
Related development

- Lavochkin La-7
- LaGG-1
- LaGG-3

Aircraft of comparable role, configuration, and era

- Curtiss P-60
- Fiat G.55 Centauro
- Focke-Wulf Fw 190
- Kawasaki Ki-100
- Macchi C.205 Veltro
- North American P-51 Mustang
- Polikarpov I-185
- Supermarine Spitfire

Related lists

- List of aircraft of World War II
- List of fighter aircraft
- List of military aircraft of the Soviet Union and the CIS
