= First on the Moon (disambiguation) =

First on the Moon may refer to:

- First on the Moon, a 2005 Russian mockumentary about a fictional 1930s Soviet landing on the Moon
- First on the Moon (1970 book), the 1970 book by the Apollo 11 crew
- The 1960 US title of Operation Columbus, a 1959 science fiction novel by Hugh Walters
- A 1958 novel by Jefferson Howard Sutton
- First on the Moon: The Untold Story, a 2005 documentary
