= Babakin =

Babakin may refer to:

- Babakin, Western Australia
- Georgy Babakin (1914–1971), Soviet space program engineer
- Babakin (lunar crater)
- Babakin Space Centre, a Lavochkin research center outside Moscow, Russia
