= Formazine =

Heterocyclic polymer produced by reacting methenamine and hydrazine sulfate

Formazine (formazin) is a heterocyclic polymer produced by reaction of hexamethylenetetramine with hydrazine sulfate.

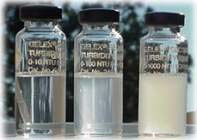
Turbidity standards of 5, 50, and 500 NTU

The hexamethylenetetramine tetrahedral cage-like structure, similar to adamantane, serves as molecular building block to form a tridimensional polymeric network.

Formazine is very poorly soluble in water and when directly synthesized in aqueous solution, by simply mixing its two highly soluble precursors, it forms small size colloidal particles. These organic colloids are responsible of the light scattering of the formazine suspensions in all the directions. Optical properties of colloidal suspensions depend on the suspended particles size and size distribution. Because formazine is a stable synthetic material with uniform particle size it is commonly used as a standard to calibrate turbidimeters and to control the reproducibility of their measurements. Formazin use was first proposed by Kingsbury et al. (1926) for the rapid standardization of turbidity measurements of albumin in urine. The unit is called Formazin Turbidity Unit (FTU). A suspension of 1.25 mg/L hydrazine sulfate and 12.5 mg/L hexamethylenetetramine in water has a turbidity of one FTU.

In the United States environmental monitoring the turbidity standard unit is called Nephelometric Turbidity Units (NTU), while the international standard unit is called Formazin Nephelometric Unit (FNU). The most generally applicable unit is Formazin Turbidity Unit (FTU), although different measurement methods can give quite different values as reported in FTU.

== Turbidity measurement ==
For turbidity measurement, a formazine suspension is prepared by mixing solutions of 10 g/L hydrazine sulfate and 100 g/L hexamethylenetetramine with ultrapure water. The resulting solution is left for 48 hours, at 25 °C ±1 °C, for the suspension to develop. This produces a suspension with a turbidity value of 4000 NTU/FAU/FTU/FNU. This is then diluted to a value to suit the instrument range. There is no straightforward relationship between FTU/FAU and NTU/FNU because it depends on the optical characteristics of the particular matter in the sample. A general difficulty encountered for preparing formazine standards is to obtain sufficiently reproducible and accurate results. The preparation temperature is essential because it affects the size of the formazine particles. Uncertainties related to temperature fluctuations are of the order of 1.2% per °C.

The purity of the water used in the preparation of the formazine dispersion is also important as it cannot initially contain colloidal particles. Experience shows that water filtered as required has a residual scatter of about 0.02 FTU = 20 mFTU (inherent brightening effect). This has to be taken into account during calibration and for the detection of very low turbidity levels. The commercially available aqueous dispersions of formazine standard are often traceable according to the EN ISO 7027 norm. The shelf life of formazine dispersions does not exceed a few months (a few weeks if the bottle has been opened) as their characteristics evolve with time due to the ageing of the colloidal particles (Ostwald ripening: change in their size distribution and in their number due to their coalescence/aggregation) and the possible development of micro-organisms such as bacteria, microscopic fungi, and yeast.

== See also ==
- Nephelometer
- ISO 7027
- Water purification
