= Vega 1 =

Soviet mission to Venus and Halley's Comet (1984–1987)

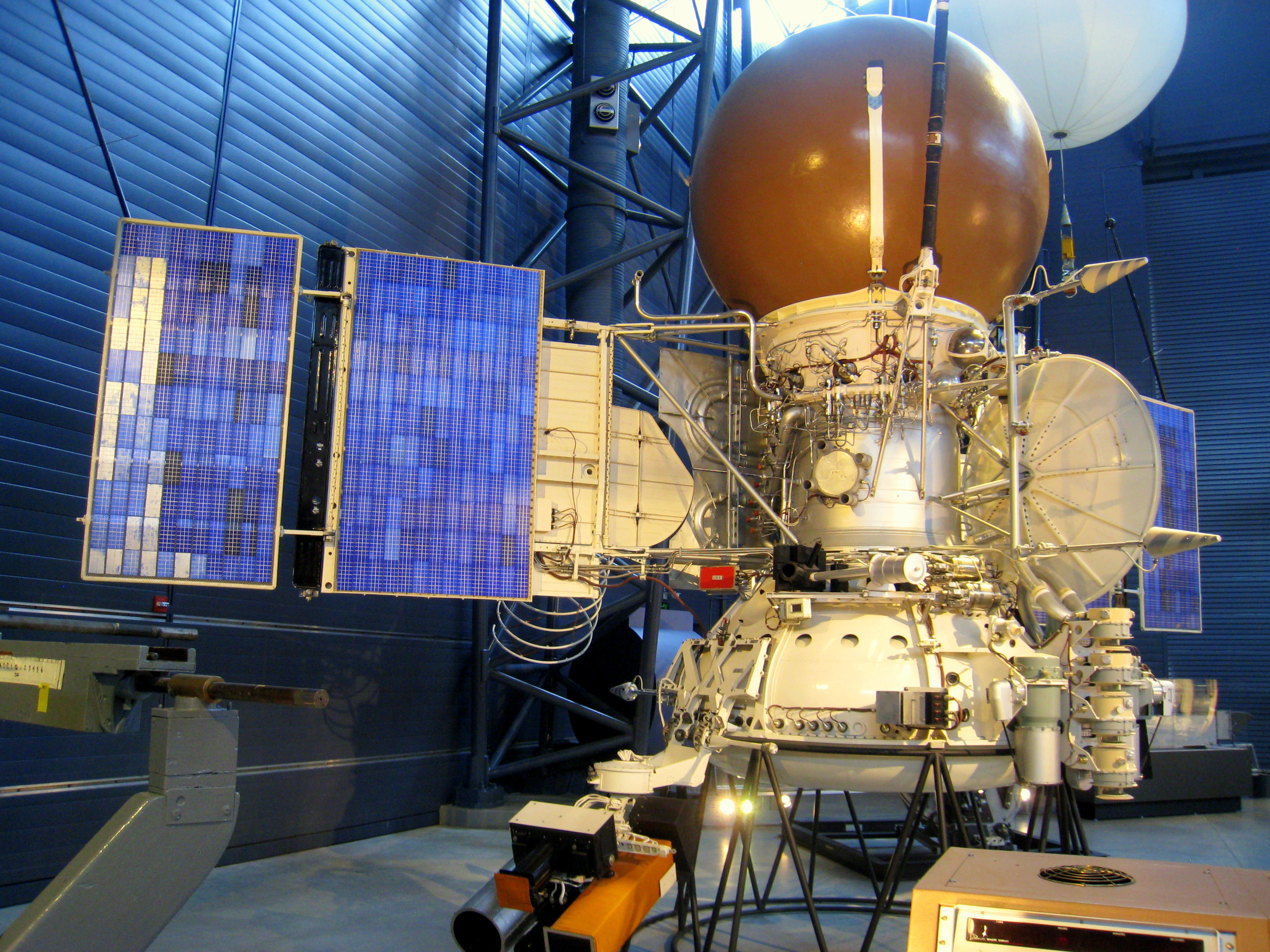
- A replica of the Vega spacecraft displayed at the Udvar-Hazy Center, Virginia, USA
- Names: Venera-Halley 1
- Mission type: Venus/Halley exploration
- Operator: Soviet space program
- COSPAR ID: 1984-125A; 1984-125E; 1984-125F
- SATCAT no.: 15432; 15858; 15859
- Mission duration: Balloon: 2 days Flyby: 2 years, 46 days

Spacecraft properties
- Spacecraft: 5VK No. 901
- Spacecraft type: 5VK
- Manufacturer: NPO Lavochkin
- Launch mass: 4,840 kg (10,670 lb)

Start of mission
- Launch date: 15 December 1984, 09:16:24 UTC
- Rocket: Proton-K/D
- Launch site: Baikonur 200/39
- Contractor: Khrunichev

End of mission
- Last contact: 30 January 1987

Orbital parameters
- Reference system: Heliocentric
- Eccentricity: 0.1700
- Perihelion altitude: 0.70 AU
- Aphelion altitude: 0.98 AU
- Inclination: 2.3°
- Period: 281 days

Flyby of Venus
- Closest approach: 11 June 1985
- Distance: ~39,000 kilometres (24,000 mi)

Venus atmospheric probe
- Spacecraft component: Vega 1 Balloon
- Atmospheric entry: 02:06:10, 11 June 1985

Venus lander
- Spacecraft component: Vega 1 Lander
- Landing date: 03:02:54, 11 June 1985
- Landing site: 8.05°N 176.89°E (north of Aphrodite Terra)

Flyby of 1P/Halley
- Closest approach: 6 March 1986
- Distance: ~10,000 km (6,200 mi)
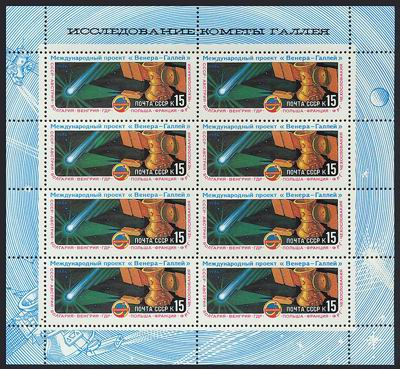
- Halley Armada Vega program

Vega 1 (along with its twin Vega 2) was a Soviet space probe, part of the Vega program. The spacecraft was a development of the earlier Venera craft. They were designed by Babakin Space Centre and constructed as 5VK by Lavochkin at Khimki. The name VeGa (ВеГа) combines the first two letters from the Russian words for Venus (Венера: "Venera") and Halley (Галлея: "Galleya").

The craft was powered by twin large solar panels and instruments included an antenna dish, cameras, spectrometer, infrared sounder, magnetometers (MISCHA), and plasma probes. The 4,840 kg (10,670 lb) craft was launched by a Proton-K rocket from Baikonur Cosmodrome, Tyuratam, Kazakh SSR. Both Vega 1 and 2 were three-axis stabilized spacecraft. The spacecraft were equipped with a dual bumper shield for dust protection from Halley's Comet.

== Venus mission ==
The descent module arrived at Venus on 11 June 1985, two days after being released from the Vega 1 flyby probe. The module, a 1,500 kg (3,300 lb) sphere with a diameter of 240 cm (94 in), contained a surface lander and a balloon explorer, which would become the first man-made aircraft to fly on a planet besides Earth. The flyby probe performed a gravitational assist maneuver using Venus, and continued its mission to intercept the comet.

=== Descent craft ===
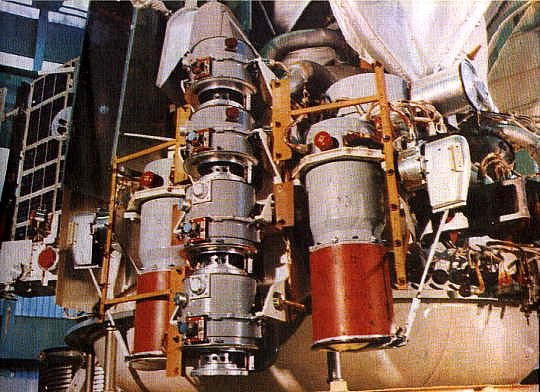
Spacecraft Vega 1

The surface lander was identical to that of Vega 2 as well as six previous Venera missions. The objective of the probe was the study of the atmosphere and the exposed surface of the planet. The scientific payload included an ultraviolet spectrometer, temperature and pressure sensors, a water concentration meter, a gas-phase chromatograph, an X-ray spectrometer, a mass spectrometer, and a surface sampling device. Since the probe made a nighttime landing, no images were taken. Several of these scientific tools (the UV spectrometer, the mass spectrograph, and the devices to measure pressure and temperature) were developed in collaboration with French scientists.

The lander successfully touched down at 8.05°N 176.89°E in the Rusalka Planitia north of Aphrodite Terra. Due to excessive turbulence, some surface experiments were inadvertently activated 20 km (12 mi) above the surface. Only the mass spectrometer was able to return data.

Tools on the lander include:

- Thermometers
- Barometers
- UV absorption spectrometer—ISAV-S
- Optical aerosol analyzer, Nephelometer—ISAV-A
- Aerosol particle-size counter—LSA
- Aerosol mass spectrometer—MALAKHIT-M
- Aerosol gas chromatograph—SIGMA-3
- Aerosol X-ray fluorescence spectrometer—IFP
- Hygrometer—VM-4
- Soil X-ray fluorescence spectrometer—BDRP-AM25
- Gamma-ray spectrometer—GS-15STsV
- Penetrometer / Soil ohmmeter—Prop-V
- Stabilized oscillator / Doppler radio

=== Balloon ===
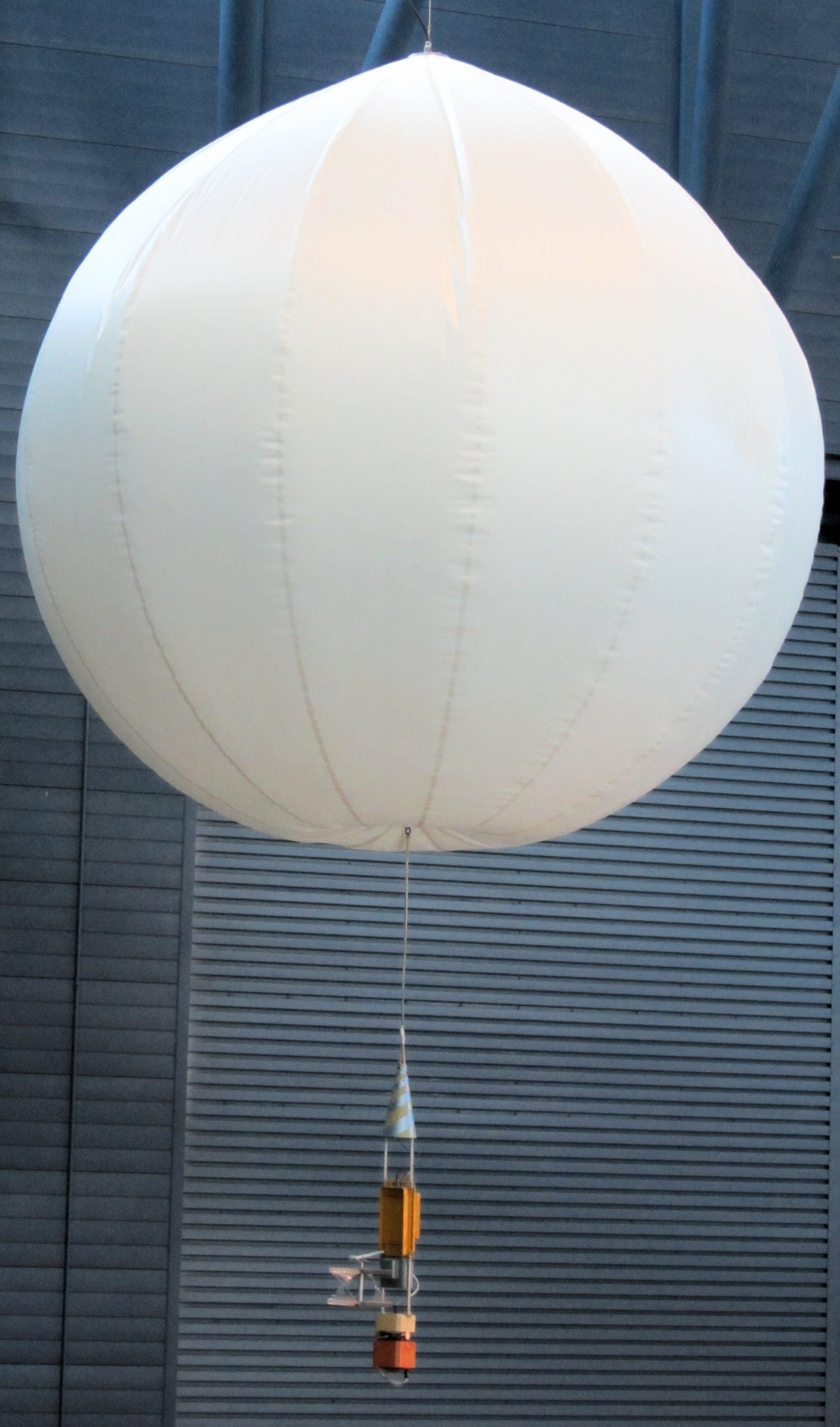
Vega balloon probe on display at the Udvar-Hazy Center of the Smithsonian Institution

The Vega 1 Lander/Balloon capsule entered the Venusian atmosphere (125 kilometres [78 mi] altitude) at 2:06:10 UT (Earth received time; Moscow time 5:06:10 AM) on 11 June 1985 at roughly 11 kilometres per second (6.8 mi/s). At approximately 2:06:25 UT the parachute attached to the landing craft cap opened at an altitude of 64 km (40 mi). The cap and parachute were released 15 seconds later at 63 km (39 mi) altitude. The balloon package was pulled out of its compartment by parachute 40 seconds later at 61 km (38 mi) altitude, at 8.1 degrees N, 176.9 degrees east. A second parachute opened at an altitude of 55 km (34 mi), 200 seconds after entry, extracting the furled balloon. The balloon was inflated 100 seconds later at 54 km (34 mi) and the parachute and inflation system were jettisoned. The ballast was jettisoned when the balloon reached roughly 50 km (31 mi) and the balloon floated back to a stable height between 53 and 54 km (33 and 34 mi) some 15 to 25 minutes after entry, becoming the first man-made aircraft to fly on a celestial body besides Earth.

The mean stable height was 53.6 kilometres (33.3 mi), with a pressure of 535 millibars (535 hPa) and a temperature of 300–310 K (27–37 °C; 80–98 °F) in the middle, most active layer of the Venus three-tiered cloud system. The balloon drifted westward in the zonal wind flow with an average speed of about 69 metres per second (230 ft/s) (248 kilometres per hour [154 mph]) at nearly constant latitude. The probe crossed the terminator from night to day at 12:20 UT on 12 June after traversing 8,500 km (5,300 mi). The probe continued to operate in the daytime until the final transmission was received at 00:38 UT on 13 June from 8.1 N, 68.8 E after a total traverse distance of 11,600 km (7,200 mi) or about 30% of the circumference of the planet. It is not known how much farther the balloon traveled after the final communication.

== Halley mission ==
After their encounters, the Vegas' motherships used the gravity of Venus, also known as a gravity assist, to intercept Halley's Comet.

Images started to be returned on 4 March 1986, and were used to help pinpoint Giotto's close flyby of the comet. The early images from Vega showed two bright areas on the comet, which were initially interpreted as a double nucleus. The bright areas would later turn out to be two jets emitting from the comet. The images also showed the nucleus to be dark, and the infrared spectrometer readings measured a nucleus temperature of 300 to 400 K (27 to 127 °C; 80 to 260 °F), much warmer than expected for an ice body. The conclusion was that the comet had a thin layer on its surface covering an icy body.

Vega 1 made its closest approach on 6 March at around 8,889 kilometres (5,523 mi) (at 07:20:06 UT) of the nucleus. It took more than 500 pictures via different filters as it flew through the gas cloud around the coma. Although the spacecraft was battered by dust, none of the instruments were disabled during the encounter.

The data intensive examination of the comet covered only the three hours around closest approach. They were intended to measure the physical parameters of the nucleus, such as dimensions, shape, temperature and surface properties, as well as to study the structure and dynamics of the coma, the gas composition close to the nucleus, the dust particles' composition and mass distribution as functions of distance to the nucleus and the cometary-solar wind interaction.

The Vega images showed the nucleus to be about 14 km (8.7 mi) long with a rotation period of about 53 hours. The dust mass spectrometer detected material similar to the composition of carbonaceous chondrites meteorites and also detected clathrate ice.

After subsequent imaging sessions on 7 and 8 March 1986, Vega 1 headed out to deep space. In total Vega 1 and Vega 2 returned about 1500 images of Comet Halley. Vega 1 ran out of attitude control propellant on 30 January 1987, and contact with Vega 2 continued until 24 March 1987.

Vega 1 is currently in heliocentric orbit, with perihelion of 0.70 AU, aphelion of 0.98 AU, eccentricity of 0.17, inclination of 2.3 degrees and orbital period of 281 days.

== See also ==
- List of missions to Venus
