= Vega 2 =

Soviet mission to Venus and Halley's Comet (1984–1987)

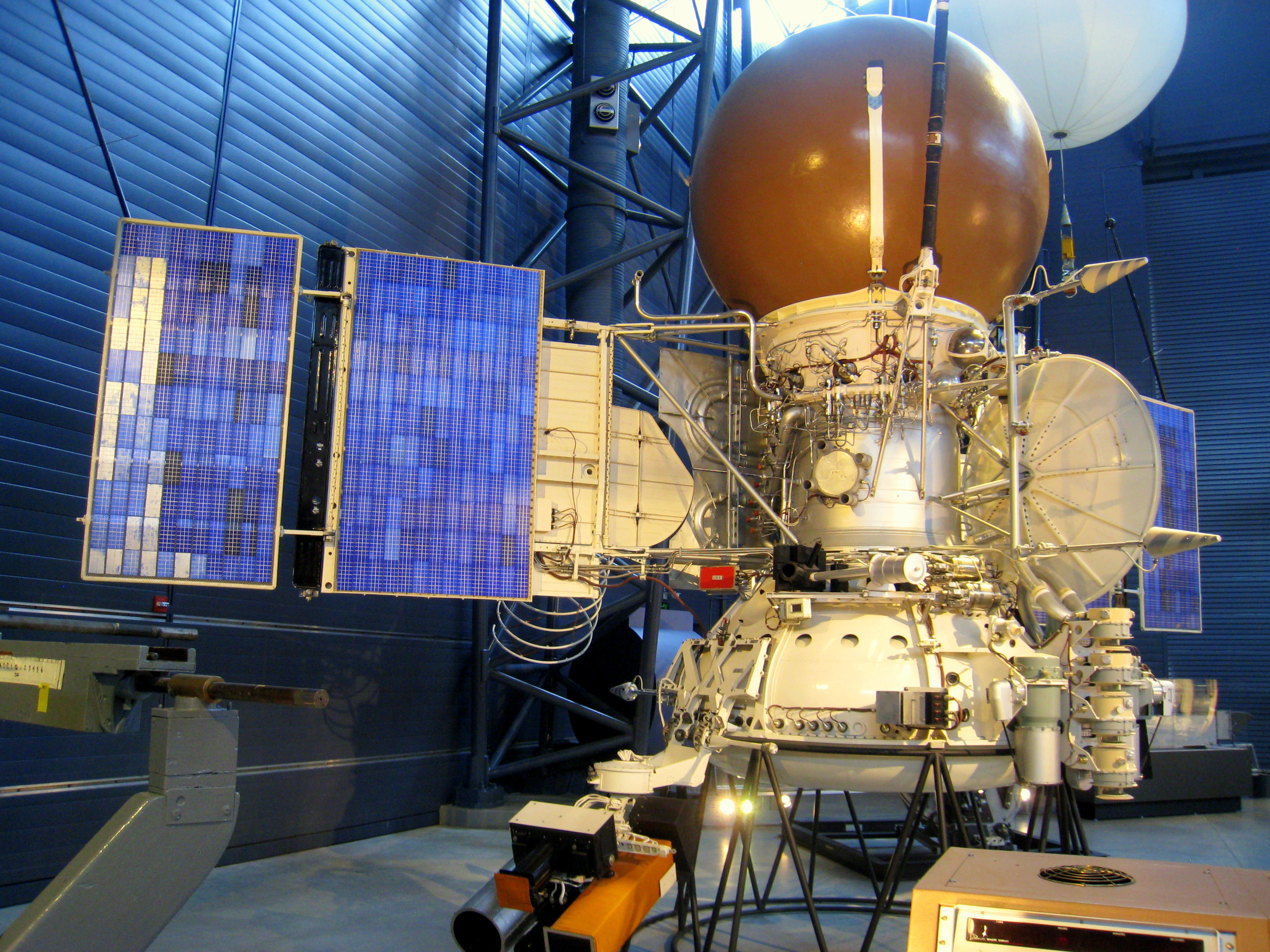
- A replica of the Vega spacecraft displayed at the Udvar-Hazy Center, Virginia, US
- Names: Venera–Halley 2
- Mission type: Venus/Halley exploration
- Operator: Soviet space program
- COSPAR ID: 1984-128A; 1984-128E; 1984-128F
- SATCAT no.: 15449; 15856; 15857
- Mission duration: Lander: 56 minutes Balloon: 2 days Flyby: 2 years, 3 months and 3 days

Spacecraft properties
- Spacecraft: 5VK No. 902
- Spacecraft type: 5VK
- Manufacturer: NPO Lavochkin
- Launch mass: 4,840 kg (10,670 lb)
- Landing mass: 1,520 kg (3,350 lb)
- Dimensions: 2.7 m × 2.3 m × 5.7 m (8.9 ft × 7.5 ft × 18.7 ft) (lander)

Start of mission
- Launch date: December 21, 1984, 09:13:52 UTC
- Rocket: Proton-K/D
- Launch site: Baikonur 200/40
- Contractor: Khrunichev

End of mission
- Last contact: March 24, 1987

Orbital parameters
- Reference system: Heliocentric
- Eccentricity: 0.17
- Perihelion altitude: 0.70 AU
- Aphelion altitude: 0.98 AU
- Inclination: 2.3°
- Period: 281 days

Flyby of Venus
- Closest approach: June 15, 1985
- Distance: 24,500 km (15,200 mi)

Venus atmospheric probe
- Spacecraft component: Vega 2 Balloon
- Atmospheric entry: 02:06:04, June 15, 1985

Venus lander
- Spacecraft component: Vega 2 Lander
- Landing date: 03:00:50, June 15, 1985
- Landing site: 7.51°S 179.8°E (north of Aphrodite Terra)

Flyby of 1P/Halley
- Closest approach: March 9, 1986
- Distance: ~8,030 km (4,990 mi)
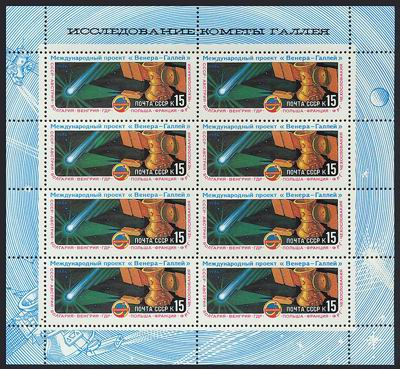
- Halley Armada Vega program

Vega 2 (along with Vega 1) was a Soviet space probe part of the Vega program to explore Halley's Comet and Venus. The spacecraft was a development of the earlier Venera craft. The name VeGa (ВеГа) combines the first two letters of the Russian words for Venus (Венера: "Venera") and Halley (Галлея: "Galleya"). They were designed by Babakin Space Centre and constructed as 5VK by Lavochkin at Khimki. The craft was powered by large twin solar panels. Instruments included an antenna dish, cameras, spectrometer, infrared sounder, magnetometers (MISCHA) and plasma probes. The 4,840-kilogram (10,670 lb) craft was launched on top of a Proton-K from Baikonur Cosmodrome, Tyuratam, Kazakh SSR. Both Vega 1 and 2 were three-axis stabilized spacecraft. The spacecraft were equipped with a dual bumper shield for dust protection from Halley's Comet.

== Venus mission ==
The descent module arrived at Venus on 15 June 1985, two days after being released from the Vega 2 flyby probe. The module, a 1,500-kilogram (3,300 lb), 240-centimetre-diameter (7.9 ft) sphere, contained a surface lander and a balloon explorer. The flyby probe performed a gravitational assist maneuver using Venus, and continued its mission to intercept the comet.

=== Lander ===
The surface lander was identical to that of Vega 1 as well as the previous six Venera missions. The objective of the probe was the study of the atmosphere and the exposed surface of the planet. The scientific payload included a UV spectrometer, temperature and pressure sensors, a water concentration meter, a gas-phase chromatograph, an X-ray spectrometer, a mass spectrometer, and a surface sampling device. Several of these scientific tools (the UV spectrometer, the mass spectrograph, and the devices to measure pressure and temperature) were developed in collaboration with French scientists. Since the probe made a nighttime landing, no images were taken.

The Vega 2 lander touched down at 03:00:50 UT on 15 June 1985 at around 7.14°S 177.67°E, in the northern region of Aphrodite Terra called Rusalka Planitia. The altitude of the touchdown site was 0.1 kilometres (330 ft) above the planetary mean radius. The measured pressure at the landing site was 91 atm and the temperature was 736 K (463 °C; 865 °F). The surface sample was found to be an anorthosite–troctolite rock, rarely found on Earth, but present in the lunar highlands, leading to the conclusion that the area was probably the oldest explored by any Venera vehicle. It transmitted data from the surface for 56 minutes.

=== Balloon ===
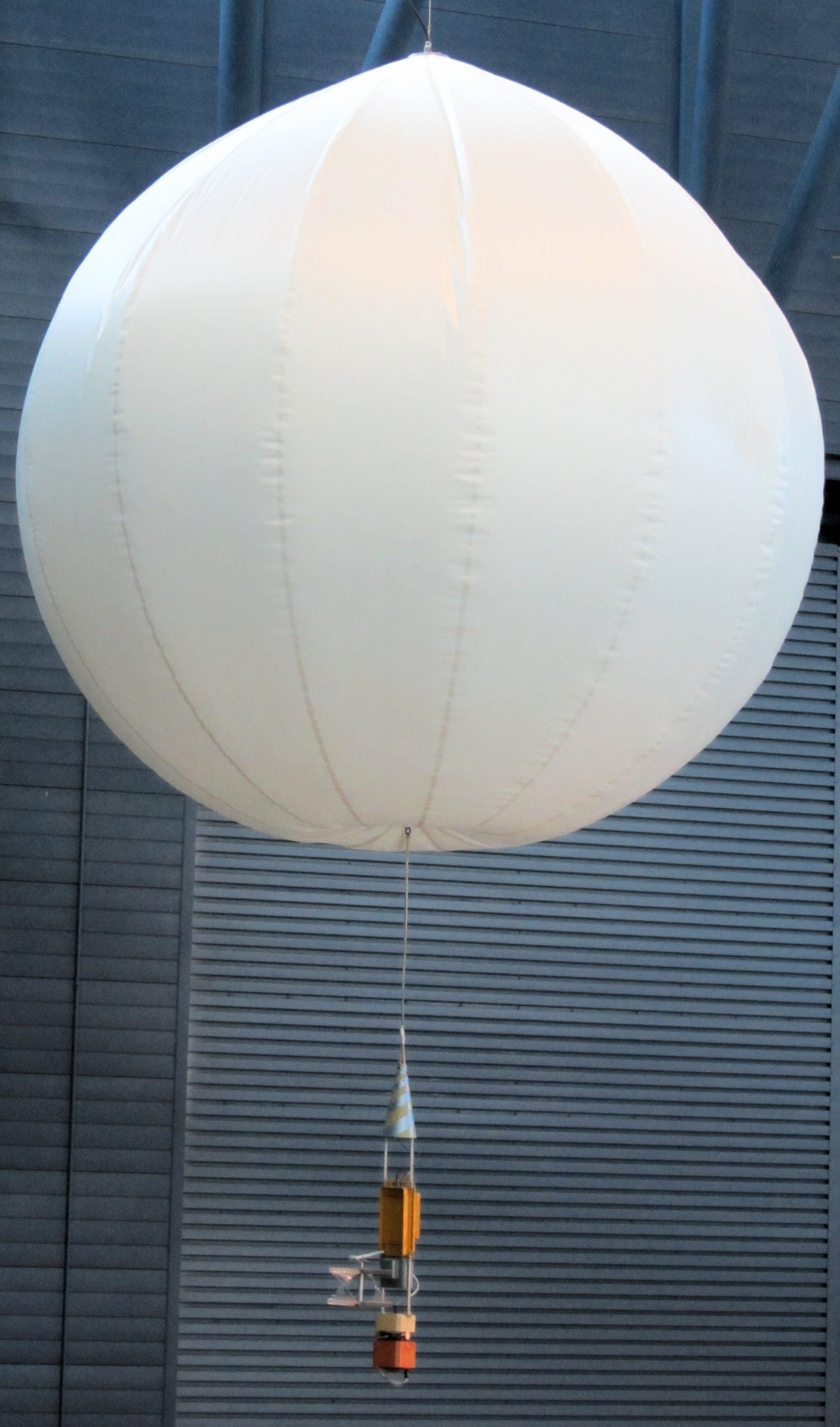
Vega balloon probe on display at the Udvar-Hazy Center of the Smithsonian Institution.

The Vega 2 Lander/Balloon capsule entered the Venusian atmosphere (125 kilometres [78 mi] altitude) at 02:06:04 UT (Earth received time; Moscow time 05:06:04) on 15 June 1985 at roughly 11 kilometres per second (6.8 mi/s). At approximately 2:06:19 UT the parachute attached to the landing craft cap opened at an altitude of 64 kilometres (40 mi). The cap and parachute were released 15 seconds later at 63 kilometres (39 mi) altitude. The balloon package was pulled out of its compartment by parachute 40 seconds later at 61 kilometres (38 mi) altitude, at 7.45°S, 179.8°E. A second parachute opened at an altitude of 55 kilometres (34 mi), 200 seconds after entry, extracting the furled balloon.

The balloon was inflated 100 seconds later at 54 kilometres (34 mi) and the parachute and inflation system were jettisoned. The ballast was jettisoned when the balloon reached roughly 50 kilometres (31 mi) and the balloon floated back to a stable height between 53 and 54 kilometres (33 and 34 mi) some 15 to 25 minutes after entry. The mean stable height was 53.6 kilometres (33.3 mi), with a pressure of 535 millibars (535 hPa) and a temperature of 308–316 K (35–43 °C; 95–109 °F) in the middle, most active layer of the Venus three-tiered cloud system. The balloon drifted westward in the zonal wind flow with an average speed of about 66 metres per second (220 ft/s) at nearly constant latitude. The probe crossed the terminator from night to day at 9:10 UT on 16 June after traversing 7,400 kilometres (4,600 mi). The probe continued to operate in the daytime until the final transmission was received at 00:38 UT on 17 June from 7.5 S, 76.3 E after a total traverse distance of 11,100 kilometres (6,900 mi), about 29% of the planet's circumference. It is not known how much further the balloon traveled after the final communication.

== Halley mission ==
After their encounters, the Vegas' motherships were redirected by Venus's gravity to intercept Halley's Comet.

The spacecraft initiated its encounter on March 7, 1986, by taking 100 photos of the comet from a distance of 14,000,000 kilometres (8,700,000 mi).

Vega 2 made its closest approach at 07:20 UT on March 9, 1986, at 8,030 kilometres (4,990 mi). The data intensive examination of the comet covered only the three hours around closest approach. They were intended to measure the physical parameters of the nucleus, such as dimensions, shape, temperature and surface properties, as well as to study the structure and dynamics of the coma, the gas composition close to the nucleus, the dust particles' composition and mass distribution as functions of distance to the nucleus and the cometary-solar wind interaction.

During the encounter, Vega 2 took 700 images of the comet, with better resolution than those from the twin Vega 1, partly due to the presence of less dust outside the coma at the time. Yet Vega 2 recorded an 80% power loss during the encounter as compared to Vega 1's 40%.

After further imaging sessions on 10 and 11 March 1986, Vega 2 finished its primary mission.

== Post Halley ==
A 6 million kilometer distant flyby of 2101 Adonis was considered, however, Vega 2 didn't have enough fuel left to make the necessary orbital changes for the flyby. Instead the Vega probes took the opportunity to measure the dust as they passed through the orbits of 72P/Denning–Fujikawa, Biela's Comet and 289P/Blanpain.

Contact with Vega 2 was lost on 24 March 1987. Vega 1 had previously exhausted its attitude control propellant on 30 January 1987.

Vega 2 is currently in heliocentric orbit, with perihelion of 0.70 AU, aphelion of 0.98 AU, eccentricity of 0.17, inclination of 2.3 degrees and orbital period of 281 days.

== See also ==
- List of missions to Venus
