= Vega program =

1985 Soviet space program with the first balloon flight on Venus

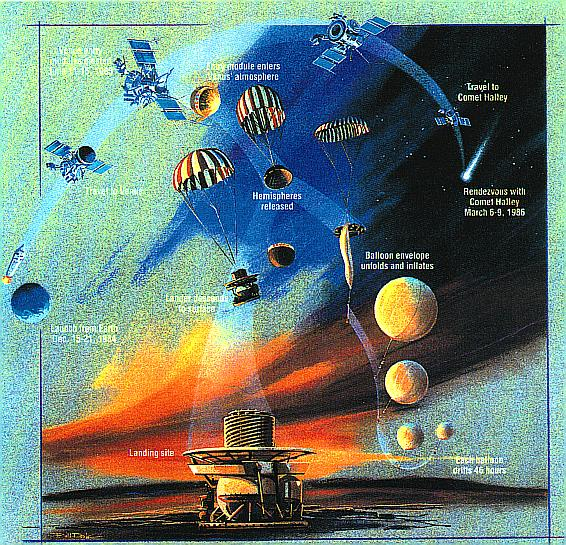
Vega mission description

The Vega program (Russian: Вега) was a series of Venus missions that also took advantage of the appearance of Halley's Comet in 1986. Vega 1 and Vega 2 were uncrewed spacecraft launched in a cooperative effort among the Soviet Union, who also provided the spacecraft and launch vehicle, Austria, Bulgaria, France, Hungary, the German Democratic Republic, Poland, Czechoslovakia, and the Federal Republic of Germany in December 1984. They had a two-part mission to investigate Venus, where each would release a lander and a balloon probe, and later conduct a flyby of Halley's Comet.

The flyby of Halley's Comet had been a late mission change in the Venera program, following on from the cancellation of the American Halley mission in 1981. A later Venera mission was canceled and the Venus part of the Vega 1 mission was reduced. Because of this, the craft was designated VeGa, a contraction of Venera and Gallei (Венера and Галлей respectively, the Russian words for "Venus" and "Halley"). The spacecraft design was based on the previous Venera 9 and Venera 10 missions.

The two spacecraft were launched on 15 and 21 December 1984, respectively. With their redesignated dual missions, the Vega probes became part of the Halley Armada, a group of space probes that studied Halley's Comet during its 1985/1986 perihelion. The balloon probes that both missions released into the Venusian atmosphere were also the first man-made aircraft to fly on a planet other than Earth, albeit unpowered, and until the operation of NASA's Ingenuity helicopter probe in 2021 the only examples of man-made extraterrestrial aircraft in history.

== The Vega spacecraft ==
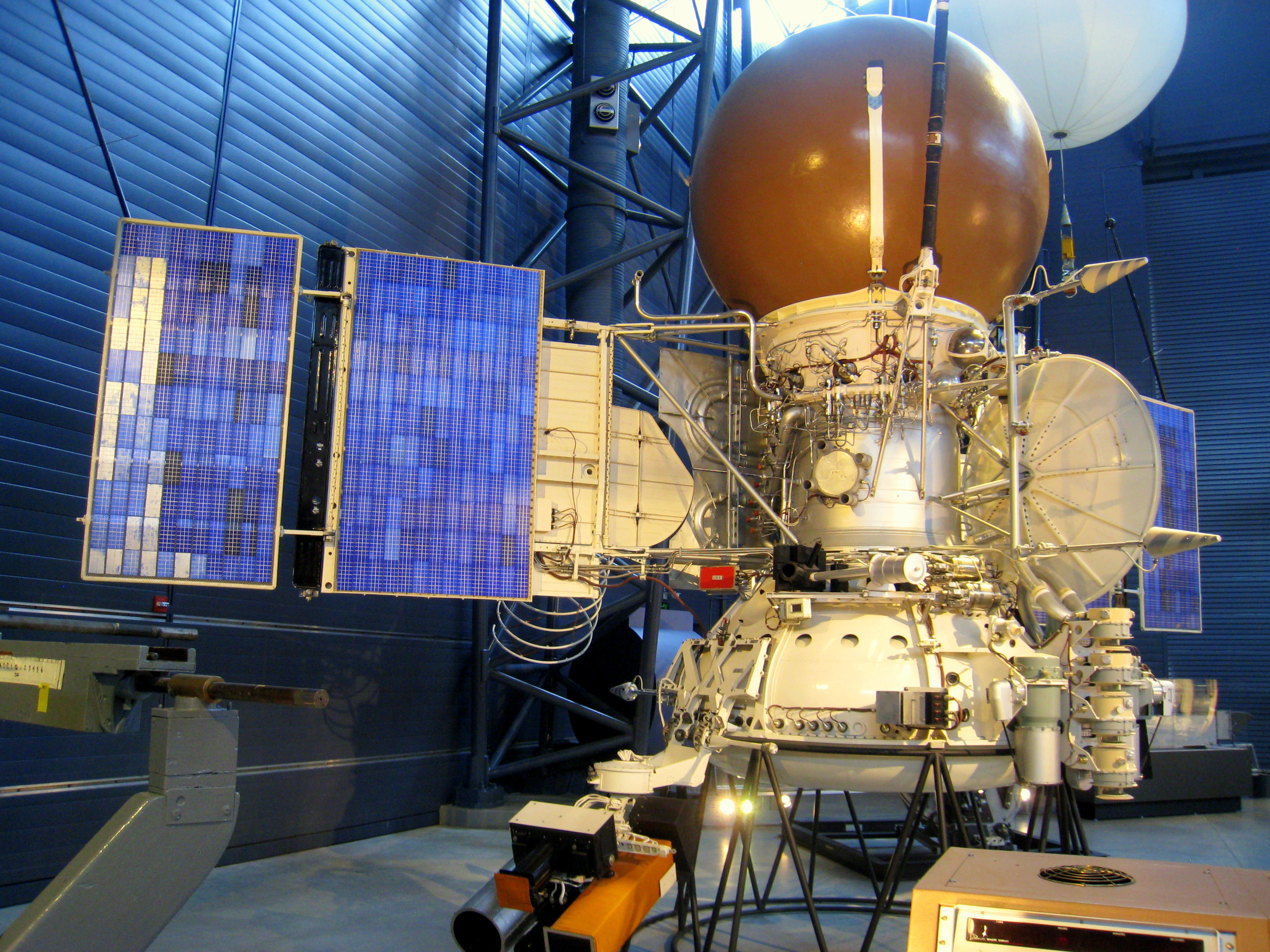
A Vega probe bus on display at the National Air and Space Museum

Vega 1 and Vega 2 were identical sister ships developed from the earlier Venera craft. They were of the 5VK type, designed by Babakin Space Center and constructed by Lavochkin at Khimki. The craft were powered by twin large solar panels and instruments included an antenna dish, cameras, spectrometer, infrared sounder, magnetometers (MISCHA; Austrian and Soviet), and plasma probes. The 4,920 kg (10,850 lb) craft were launched by a Proton 8K82K rocket from Baikonur Cosmodrome, Tyuratam, Kazakh SSR (current Kazakhstan). Both Vega 1 and Vega 2 were three-axis stabilized spacecraft. The spacecraft were equipped with a dual bumper shield for dust protection from Halley's comet.

=== Bus Instruments ===
- imaging system
- infrared spectrometer
- ultraviolet, visible, infrared imaging spectrometer
- shield penetration detector
- dust detectors
- dust mass spectrometer
- neutral gas mass spectrometer
- APV-V plasma energy analyzer
- energetic-particle analyzer
- magnetometer (Austrian-Soviet)
- wave and plasma analyzers

== The Venus mission ==
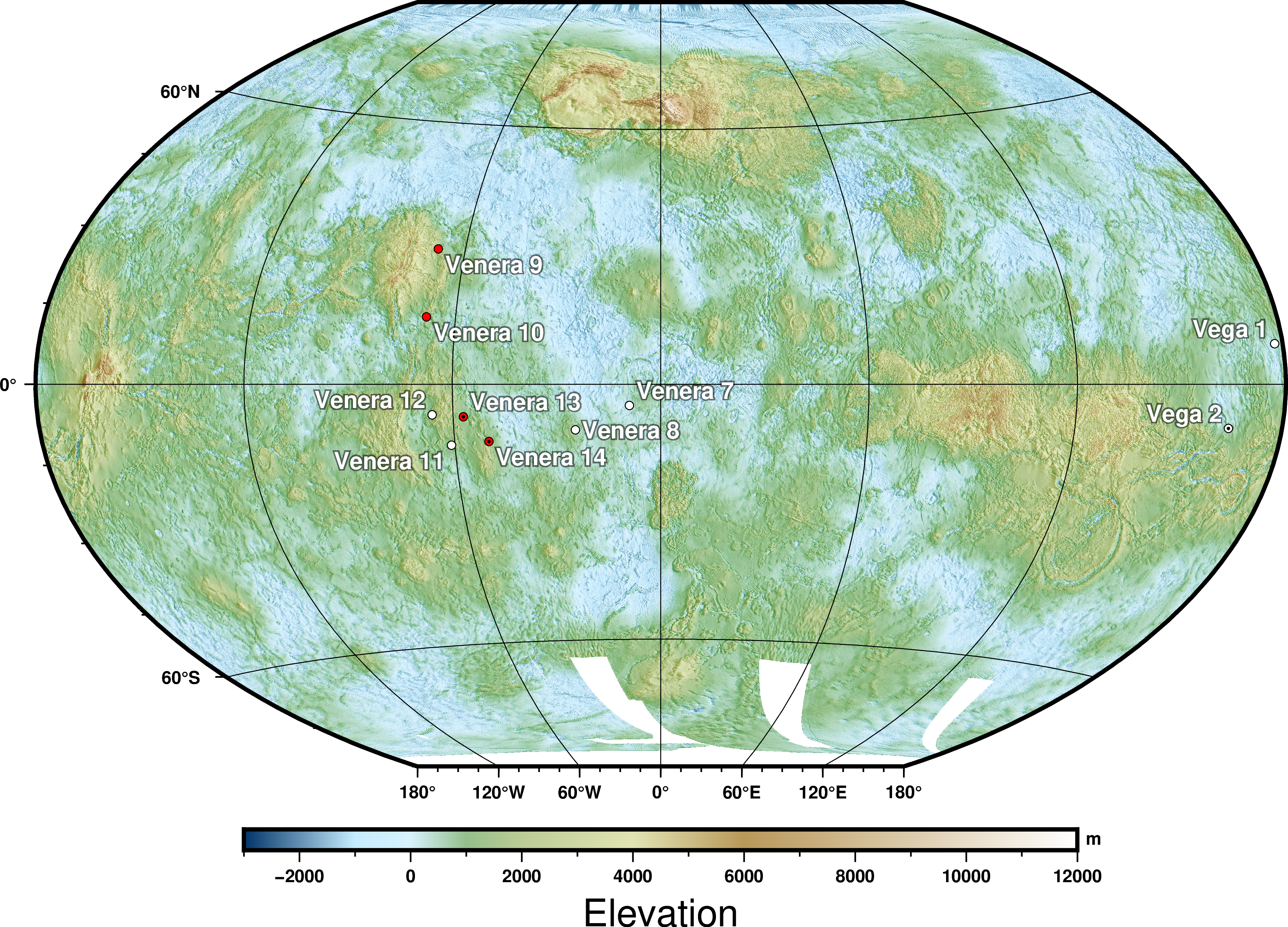
Position of Vega landing sites. Red points denote sites returning images from the surface, black central dots sites of surface sample analysis. Map based on mapping from Pioneer Venus Orbiter, Magellan, and Venera 15/16.

Vega 1 arrived at Venus on 11 June 1985 and Vega 2 on 15 June 1985, and each delivered a 1,500 kg (3,300 lb), 240 cm (94 in) diameter spherical descent unit. The units were released some days before each arrived at Venus and entered the atmosphere without active inclination changes. Each contained a lander and a balloon explorer.

=== Descent craft ===
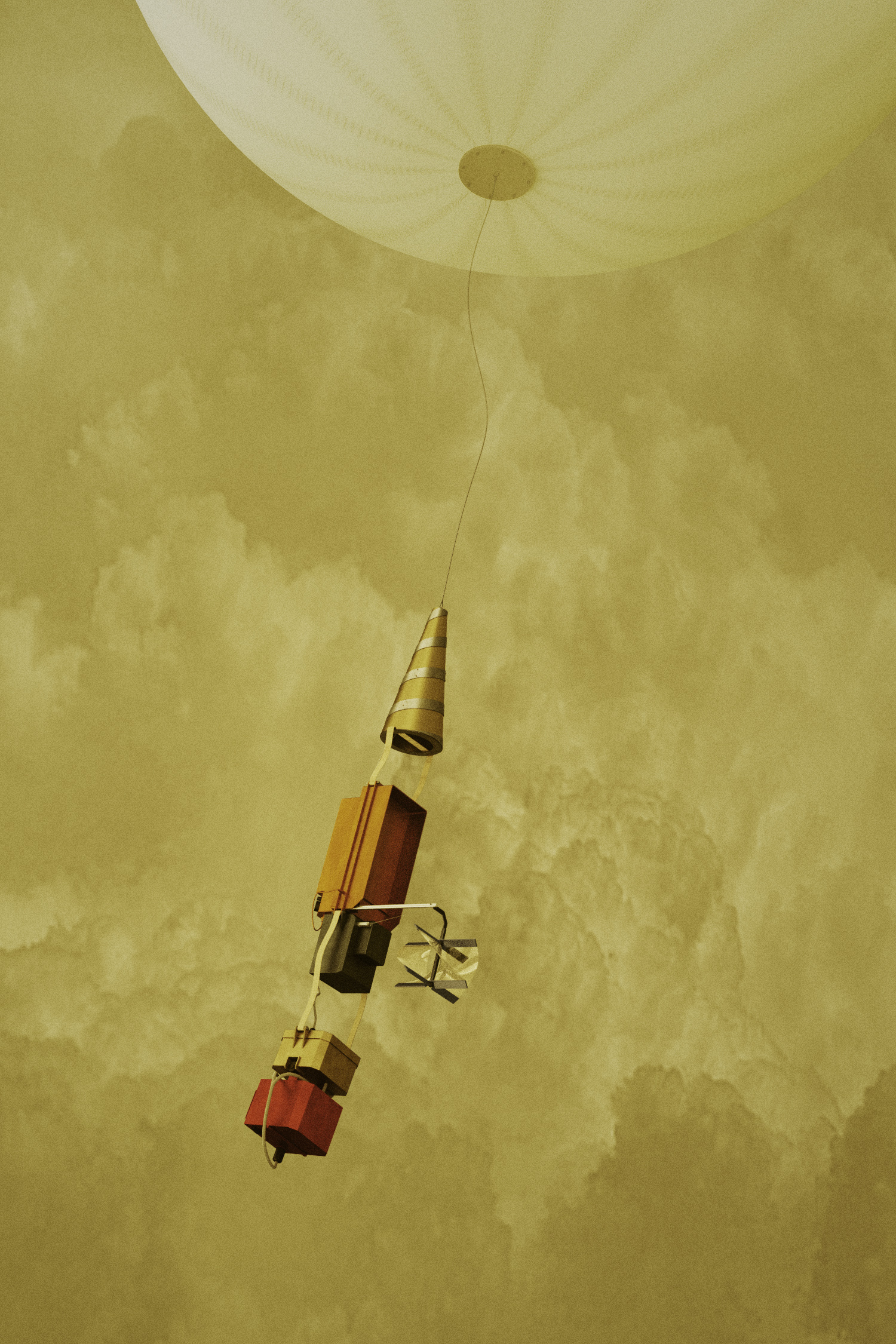
Artist's impression of the Vega probe on Venus

The landers were identical to that of the previous five Venera missions and were to study the atmosphere and surface. Each had instruments to study temperature and pressure, a UV spectrometer, a water concentration meter, a gas-phase chromatograph, an X-ray spectrometer, a mass spectrometer, and a surface sampling device.

The Vega 1 lander's surface experiments were inadvertently activated at 20 km (12 mi) from the surface by an especially hard wind jolt, and so failed to provide results. It landed at 7.5°N, 177.7°E.

The Vega 2 lander touched down at 03:00:50 UT on 15 June 1985 at 8.5° S, 164.5° E, in eastern Aphrodite Terra. The altitude of the touchdown site was 0.1 km (0.062 mi) above the planetary mean radius. The measured pressure at the landing site was 91 atm and the temperature was 736 K (463 °C; 865 °F). The surface sample was found to be an anorthosite-troctolite. The lander transmitted data from the surface for 56 minutes.

==== Payload ====
- Meteocomplex T, P sensors
- Sigma-3 gas chromatograph
- LSA particle size spectrometer
- IFP aerosol analyzer
- VM-4 hygrometer
- ISAV-A nephelometer/scatterometer
- Malakhit-V mass spectrometer
- ISAV-S UV spectrometer
- GZU VB-02 drill + BDRP-AM25 soil X-ray fluorescence spectrometer
- GS-15-STsV gamma ray spectrometer
- PrOP-V penetrometer
- MSB small solar batteries

=== Balloon ===
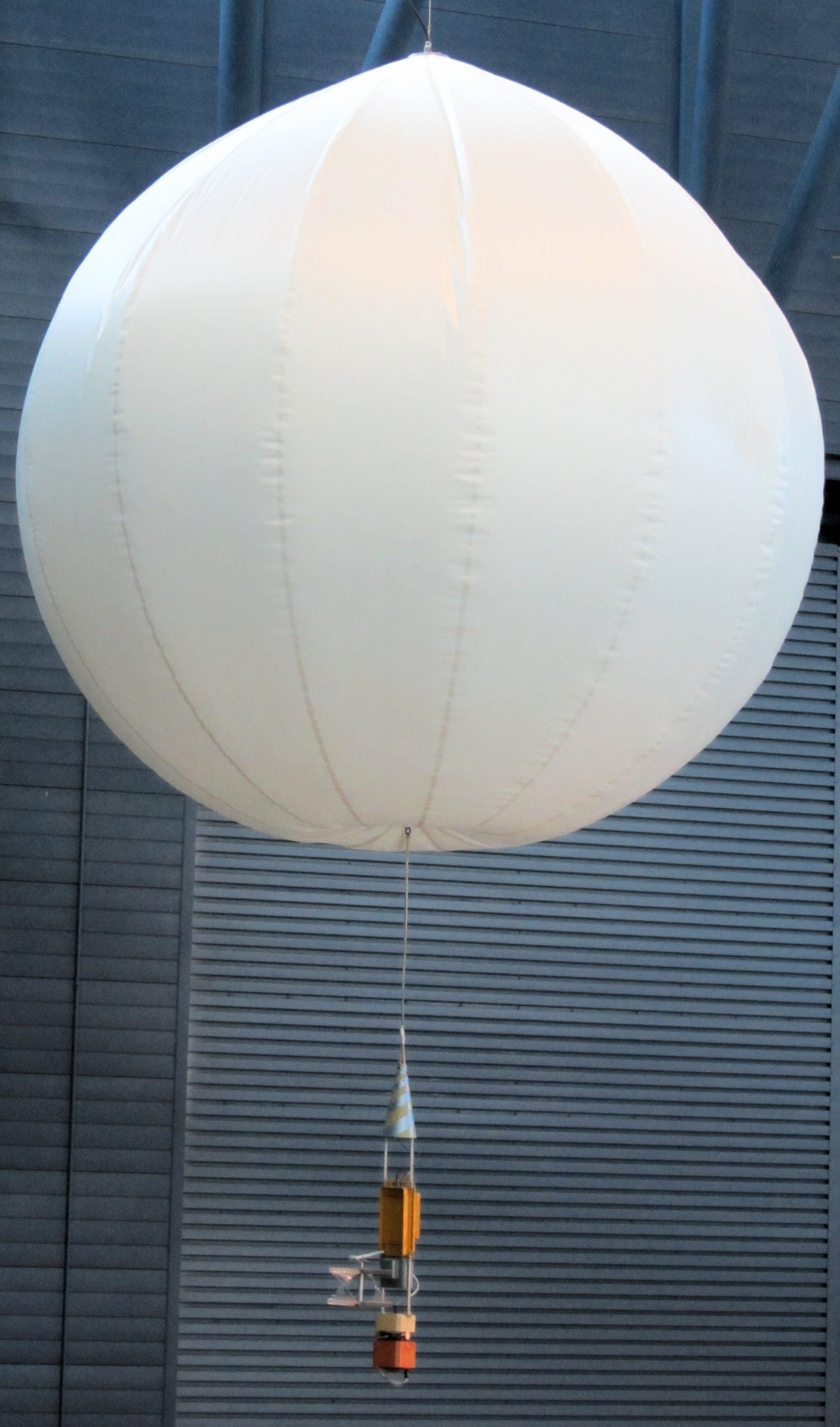
Vega balloon probe on display at the Udvar-Hazy Center of the Smithsonian Institution. Photo by Geoffrey A. Landis.

The two balloon aerobots were designed to float at 54 km (34 mi) from the surface, in the most active layer of the Venusian cloud system. The instrument pack had enough battery power for 60 hours of operation and measured temperature, pressure, wind speed, and aerosol density. The balloon envelopes were surfaced with polytetrafluoroethylene to resist attack by the corrosive atmosphere. Both Vega-1 and Vega-2 balloons operated for more than 46 hours from injection to the final transmission.

The balloons were of spherical superpressure types of 3.54 m (11.6 ft) diameter, filled with helium. A gondola assembly weighing 6.9 kg (15 lb) and 1.3 m (4 ft 3 in) long was connected to the balloon envelope by a tether 13 m (43 ft) long. Total mass of the entire assembly was 21 kg (46 lb).

The top section of the gondola assembly was capped by a conical antenna 37 cm (15 in) tall and 13 cm (5.1 in) wide at the base. Beneath the antenna was a module containing the radio transmitter and system control electronics. The lower section of the gondola assembly carried the instrument payload and batteries.

The instruments consisted of:

- An arm carrying thin-film resistance thermometers and a velocity anemometer. The anemometer consisted of a free-spinning plastic propeller, whose spin was measured by LED-photodetector optointerrupters.
- A module containing a PIN diode photodetector to measure light levels and a vibrating-quartz-beam pressure sensor.
- A package at the bottom carrying the batteries and a nephelometer to measure cloud density through light reflection.

The small low-power (5 watt) transmitter only allowed a data transmission rate of 2,048 bit/s, though the system performed data compression to squeeze more information through the narrow bandwidth. Nonetheless, the sampling rate for most of the instruments was only once every 75 seconds. The balloons were tracked by two networks (20 radio telescopes total) back on Earth: the Soviet network, coordinated by the Soviet Academy of Sciences, and the international network, coordinated by Centre national d'études spatiales of France (CNES).

The balloons were pulled out of the lander at 180,000 feet (55 km) above the planet's darkside surface, and fell to 164,000 feet (50 km) ASL while they were being inflated. After that, they rose to 177,000 feet (54 km) and stabilized. At this altitude, pressure and temperature conditions of Venus are similar to those of Earth at 18,000 feet MSL (5,5 km), though the planet's winds move at hurricane velocity, and the carbon dioxide atmosphere is laced with sulfuric acid, along with smaller concentrations of hydrochloric and hydrofluoric acid.

The balloons moved swiftly across the night side of the planet into the light side, where their batteries finally died, and contact was lost. Tracking indicated that the motion of the balloons included a surprising vertical component, revealing vertical motions of air masses that had not been detected by earlier probe missions.

== The Halley mission ==
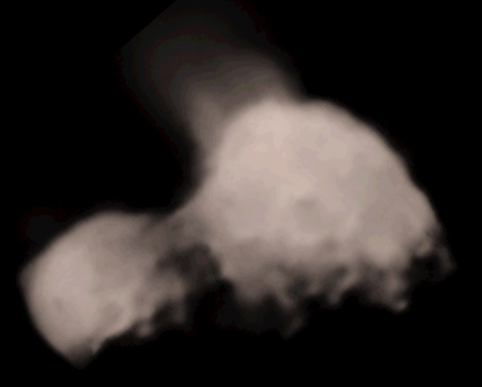
Halley as seen from Vega 2

After their encounters, the Vega motherships were redirected to intercept Halley's Comet, utilizing the gravity of Venus to alter their trajectory.

Vega 1 made its closest approach on 6 March, around 8,890 km (5,520 mi) from the nucleus, and Vega 2 made its closest approach on 9 March at 8,030 km (4,990 mi). The data intensive examination of the comet covered only the three hours around closest approach. They were intended to measure the physical parameters of the nucleus, such as dimensions, shape, temperature, and surface properties, as well as to study the structure and dynamics of the coma, the gas composition close to the nucleus, the dust particles' composition and mass distribution as functions of distance to the nucleus, and the cometary-solar wind interaction.

In total Vega 1 and Vega 2 returned about 1,500 images of Halley's Comet. Spacecraft operations were discontinued a few weeks after the Halley encounters.

The on-board video system was created in international cooperation of the scientific and industrial facilities from the USSR, Hungary, France, and Czechoslovakia. The video data was processed by an international team, including scientists from the Soviet Union, Hungary, France, East Germany, and the United States. The basic steps of data acquisition and preprocessing were performed in IKI using an image processing computer system based on a PDP-11/40 compatible host.

Vega 1 and Vega 2 are currently in heliocentric orbits.

== See also ==
- Pioneer Venus Orbiter
- Venera program
