= Olga Vladimirovna Nikolaeva =

Soviet and Russian planetary geochemist

- Ольга Владимировна Николаева
- Born: 1941
- Died: 2000 (aged 58–59)
- Known for: Geochemical studies of Venus; interpretation of Venera and Vega lander data; Venus surface and atmosphere research
- Scientific career
- Fields: Planetary science, geochemistry, Venus
- Institutions: Vernadsky Institute of Geochemistry and Analytical Chemistry

Olga Vladimirovna Nikolaeva (Russian: Ольга Владимировна Николаева; 1941–2000) was a Soviet and Russian planetary geochemist and planetologist. Her work concerned the geology, geochemistry and mineralogy of Venus, especially interpretations of Soviet Venera and Vega lander measurements. Nikolaeva was a researcher at the Vernadsky Institute of Geochemistry and Analytical Chemistry, where she worked on comparative planetology and the interpretation of planetary-surface data. She was a co-author of widely cited Venus studies, including analyses of the Venera 9 and 10 landing sites, a geochemical model of the Venusian troposphere, the KONTRAST geochemical indicator carried by Venera 13 and 14, and a 1983 Science paper on possible sedimentary rocks on Venus. The Venusian feature Nikolaeva Patera was named in her honour by the International Astronomical Union in 2006.

== Research career ==
Nikolaeva's early planetary work included lunar and Venus studies at the Soviet Academy of Sciences' Vernadsky Institute. In the mid-1970s she co-authored a Vernadsky Institute report on lunar soil properties and analogues, presenting a 1974 model relevant to spacecraft engineering and landing studies. In 1988 she was one of the authors of "Comparative Planetology", an article in the Soviet historical-astronomical volume Istoriko-astronomicheskie issledovaniia.

=== Venera lander studies ===
Nikolaeva was among the Soviet researchers who interpreted data returned from the Venera missions. She co-authored the 1977 Geological Society of America Bulletin paper on the surface of Venus as revealed by Venera 9 and Venera 10. She also co-authored a 1978 Icarus paper proposing a geochemical model of the Venusian troposphere; that model interpreted Venus's atmosphere in terms of vertical geochemical zoning and diurnal changes in the lower cloud layer. For Venera 13 and Venera 14, Nikolaeva took part in studies of the chemical and optical properties of the Venusian surface. The KONTRAST geochemical indicator paper reported oxidizing-reducing conditions near the surface of Venus from measurements made by those spacecraft. G. A. Burba later credited Nikolaeva with leading the development of the indicator and stated that two Soviet patents were obtained for the invention. She also co-authored work on albedo and colour properties of the Venusian surface as observed from Venera 13 data. In 1983 Nikolaeva was one of the authors of a Science paper using close-up panoramic images from Venera 13 and Venera 14 to examine whether some layered rocks on Venus might be sedimentary rather than volcanic in origin. The paper discussed ripple marks, thin layering, differential erosion and other features in the Venera panoramas, while noting that the origin of the possible sediments remained uncertain.

=== Venus geology and geochemistry ===
Nikolaeva also worked on geological structures mapped by Soviet radar missions. She co-authored a paper on the main types of structures in the northern hemisphere of Venus, based on data from Venera 15 and Venera 16. Burba credited her with defining arachnoids as a specific class of endogenic geological structures on Venus. Her later work focused on geochemical comparisons between terrestrial igneous rocks and rocks inferred from Venera measurements. In 1990 she argued that the Venera 8 landing-site material could indicate continental-type crust on Venus. She then co-authored a Magellan-based study of the Venera 8 landing-site region, combining morphological and geochemical considerations. In the 1990s Nikolaeva published studies of potassium, uranium and thorium systematics in planetary materials. A 2023 review in Space Science Reviews noted that felsic compositions for the Venera 8 and Venera 13 sites had been considered by Nikolaeva on the basis of comparisons with terrestrial arc rocks, and cited her 1990, 1995 and 1997 work in that context. In her last published paper, with Alexey A. Ariskin, she used K-U-Th constraints to argue that the available Venus surface measurements were not explained by several earlier petrogenetic models for Venus basalts.

== Legacy ==
The Venusian feature Nikolaeva Patera was named in Nikolaeva's honour. The name was approved by the International Astronomical Union in 2006.

== Selected publications ==
- Florensky, K. P.; Basilevsky, A. T.; Nikolaeva, O. V. (1975). Лунный грунт: свойства и аналоги. Модель 1974 г. [Lunar soil: properties and analogues. The 1974 model] (in Russian). Moscow: USSR Academy of Sciences, Vernadsky Institute.
- Florensky, C. P.; Ronca, L. B.; Basilevsky, A. T.; Burba, G. A.; Nikolaeva, O. V.; Pronin, A. A.; Trakhtman, A. M.; Volkov, V. P.; Zasetsky, V. V. (1977). "The surface of Venus as revealed by Soviet Venera 9 and 10". Geological Society of America Bulletin. 88: 1537–1545.
- Florensky, C. P.; Volkov, V. P.; Nikolaeva, O. V. (1978). "A geochemical model of the Venus troposphere". Icarus. 33 (3): 537–553. doi:10.1016/0019-1035(78)90189-6.
- Florensky, C. P.; Nikolaeva, O. V.; Volkov, V. P.; Kudryashova, A. F.; Pronin, A. A.; Geektin, Yu. M.; Tchaikina, E. A.; Bashkirova, A. S. (1983). "The oxidizing-reducing conditions on the surface of Venus according to the data of the 'KONTRAST' geochemical indicator on the Venera 13 and Venera 14 spacecraft". Cosmic Research. 21: 278–281.
- Florensky, C. P.; Basilevsky, A. T.; Kryuchkov, V. P.; Kuzmin, R. O.; Nikolaeva, O. V.; Pronin, A. A.; Chernaya, I. M.; Tyuflin, Yu. S.; Selivanov, A. S.; Naraeva, M. K.; Ronca, L. B. (1983). "Venera 13 and Venera 14: Sedimentary rocks on Venus?". Science. 221 (4605): 57–59. doi:10.1126/science.221.4605.57. PMID 17738015.
- Barsukov, V. L.; Basilevsky, A. T.; Kuzmin, R. O.; Markov, M. S.; Kryuchkov, V. P.; Nikolaeva, O. V.; Pronin, A. A.; Sukhanov, A. L.; Chernaya, I. M.; Burba, G. A. (1985). "Main types of structures of the northern hemisphere of Venus". Solar System Research. 19: 1–9.
- Shkuratov, Yu. G.; Kreslavsky, M. A.; Nikolayeva, O. V. (1987). Diagram Albedo-Color of Venus Surface According to Venera-13 Data. Lunar and Planetary Science Conference XVIII. p. 914.
- Nikolaeva, O. V. (1990). "Geochemistry of the Venera 8 material demonstrates the presence of continental crust on Venus". Earth, Moon, and Planets. 50/51: 329–342. doi:10.1007/BF00142398.
- Basilevsky, A. T.; Nikolaeva, O. V.; Weitz, C. M. (1992). "Geology of the Venera 8 landing site region from Magellan data: Morphological and geochemical considerations". Journal of Geophysical Research: Planets. 97 (E10): 16315–16335. doi:10.1029/92JE01557.
- Nikolaeva, O. V. (1995). "K-U-Th systematics of terrestrial magmatic rocks for planetary comparisons: terrestrial N-MORBs and Venusian basaltic material". Geochemistry International. 33: 1–11.
- Nikolaeva, O. V. (1997). "K-U-Th systematics of igneous rocks for planetological comparisons: oceanic island-arc volcanics on Earth versus rocks on the surface of Venus". Geochemistry International. 35: 424–447.
- Nikolaeva, O. V.; Ariskin, A. A. (1999). "Geochemical constraints on petrogenic processes on Venus". Journal of Geophysical Research: Planets. 104 (E8): 18889–18897. doi:10.1029/1996JE000337.
