= In situ water treatment =

Treating a body of water with reagents or other substances

In situ or direct dosing water treatment involves mixing and dosing chemical reagents or other substances directly into the affected water body for the treatment of a number of issues, instead of pumping water for treatment through a water treatment plant.

== Applications ==
Applications of in situ water treatment include acid mine drainage (AMD) treatment, turbidity control, algal control, nutrient pollution control, metal control, disinfection, chlorination, cyanide destruction, pH control, salinity control and lowering dissolved metals.

In situ water treatment is commonly used in the mining industry for a number of applications including the treatment of acid mine drainage and turbidity. In situ treatment of turbidity is often used for controlling turbidity in stormwater collection ponds at coal mine sites and coal loading facilities especially in Australia and Indonesia.

Some municipalities with numerous small water storage reservoirs spread out over a geographical location use in situ treatment for the control of turbidity. Although rare chlorine has been dosed directly into water bodies for the purpose of disinfection.

Oil spills often require in situ water treatment, whether offshore or inshore. These can be treated one of four ways: chemical, burning, mechanical, or bioremediation.

== Technologies ==
There are a number of technologies available for the in situ water treatment. Reagent can be mixed into a slurry in a vertical mixing tank, or similar, and dosed directly into the water body (e.g. a tailings storage facility (TSF) or pond) via a pipeline. Some systems mix the reagent in a tank and spray it into the water body using a spray cannon. Other technologies mix and dose into the water body using a mobile water based floating system.

The technology must be selected carefully based on the application and the reagent selected. For example for the treatment of turbidity the flocculant must be evenly dispensed over the surface of the water body to allow it to settle through creating flocs.
