= 5VK =

Soviet unmanned Venus and Halley comet probe design

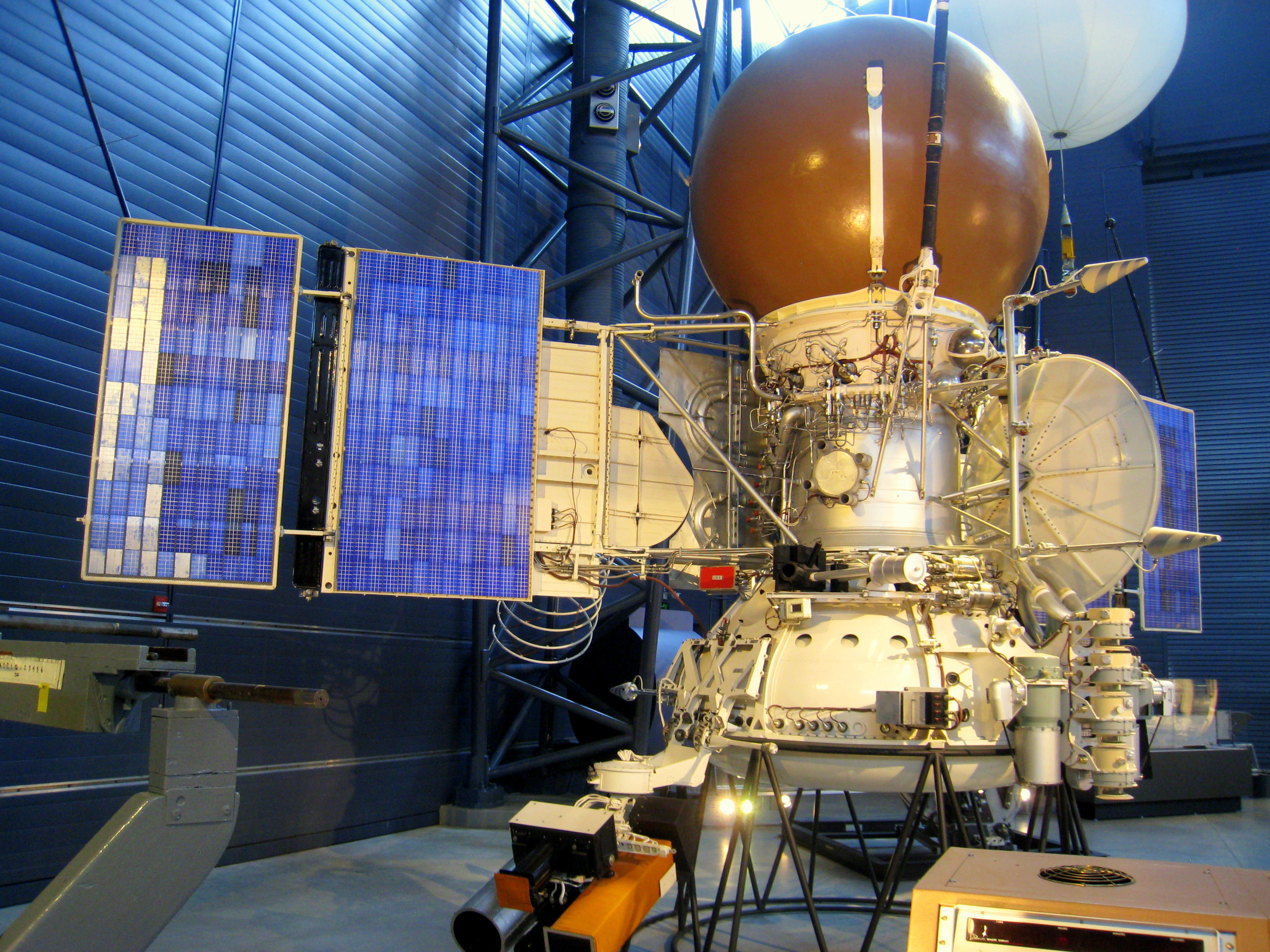
- Vega solar system probe bus and landing apparatus (model) - Udvar-Hazy Center
- Manufacturer: OKB-1
- Country of origin: Soviet Union
- Operator: Soviet Space Program

The 5VK planetary probe (short for 5th-generation Venus-Comet probe) is a designation for a common design used for Soviet unmanned probes to comet 1P/Halley and Venus.

It was an incremental improvement of earlier 4MV probes used for Mars and Venus missions.

== Design ==
The craft was three-axis stabilized and powered by twin large solar panels, weighing 4,920 kg (10,850 lb). They were equipped with a dual bumper shield for dust protection from Halley's comet. Instruments included an antenna dish, cameras, spectrometer, infrared sounder, magnetometers, and plasma probes.

== Variants ==
- Vega 1 (5VK No.901)
- Vega 2 (5VK No.902)

== See also ==
- Soviet space program
- Vega program
- 4MV
