= Nephelometer =

Instrument for measuring the concentration of suspended particulates

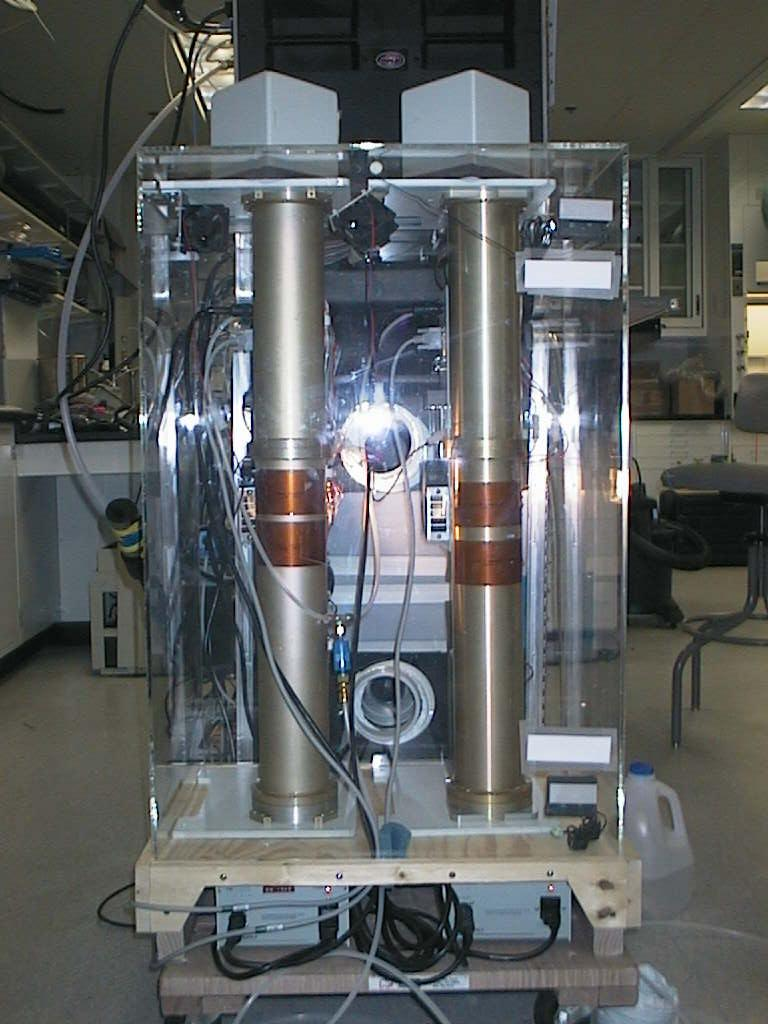
A nephelometer at the Kosan, Cheju Island, South Korea NOAA facility

A nephelometer or aerosol photometer is an instrument for measuring the concentration of suspended particulates in a liquid or gas colloid. A nephelometer measures suspended particulates by employing a light beam (source beam) and a light detector set to one side (often 90°) of the source beam. Particle density is then a function of the light reflected into the detector from the particles. To some extent, how much light reflects for a given density of particles is dependent upon properties of the particles such as their shape, color, and reflectivity. Nephelometers are calibrated to a known particulate, then use environmental factors (k-factors) to compensate lighter or darker colored dusts accordingly. K-factor is determined by the user by running the nephelometer next to an air sampling pump and comparing results. There are a wide variety of research-grade nephelometers on the market as well as open source varieties.

== Nephelometer uses ==
External videos
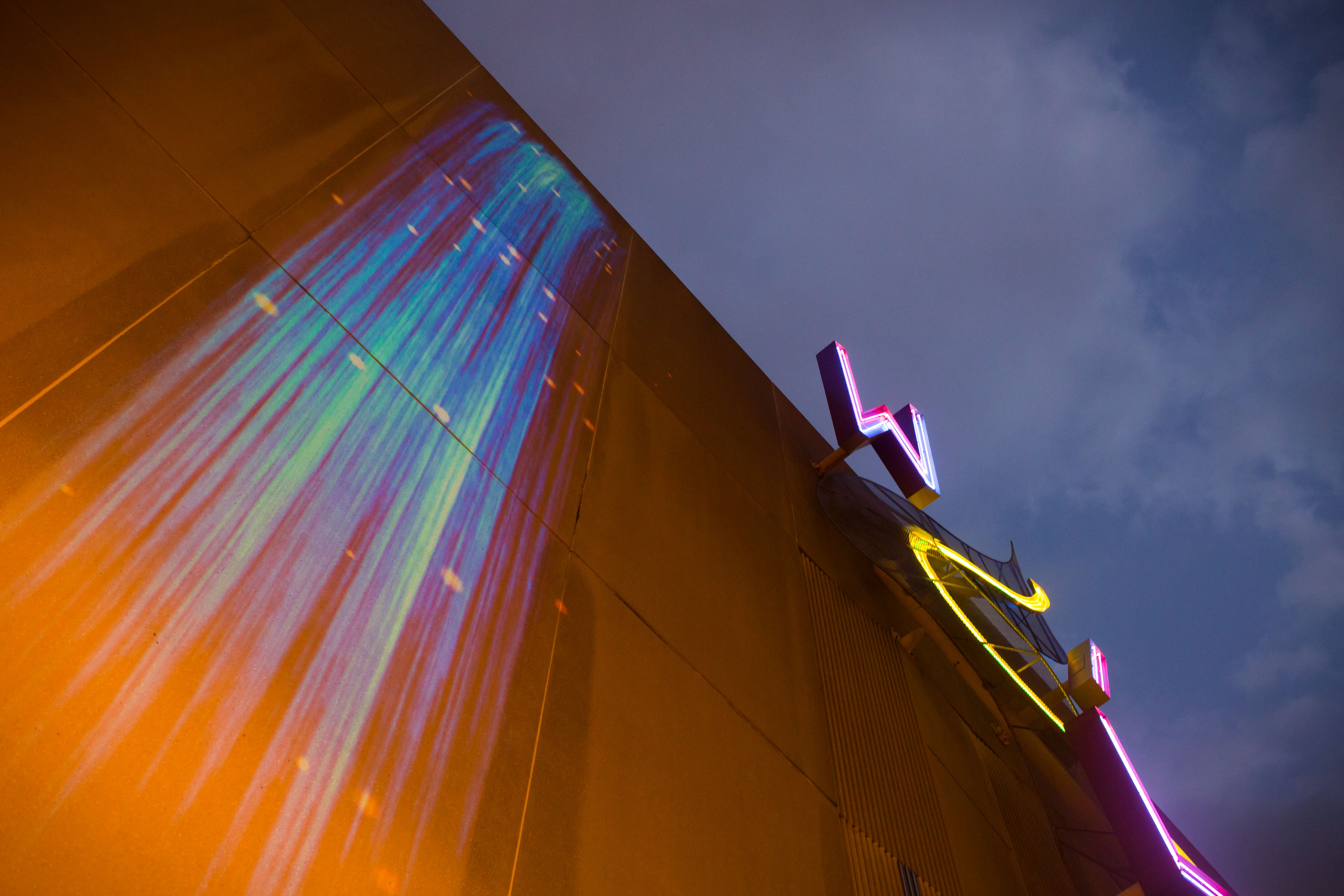
- Andrea Polli, Particle Falls, an art installation using a nephelometer to visualize particulate matter (2013).

Particulate contaminants (size in micrometers).

The main uses of nephelometers relate to air quality measurement for pollution monitoring, climate monitoring, and visibility. Airborne particles are commonly either biological contaminants, particulate contaminants, gaseous contaminants, or dust.

The accompanying chart shows the types and sizes of various particulate contaminants. This information helps understand the character of particulate pollution inside a building or in the ambient air, as well as the cleanliness level in a controlled environment.

Biological contaminants include mold, fungus, bacteria, viruses, animal dander, dust mites, pollen, human skin cells, cockroach parts, or anything alive or living at one time. They are the biggest enemy of indoor air quality specialists because they are contaminants that cause health problems. Levels of biological contamination depend on humidity and temperature that supports the livelihood of micro-organisms. The presence of pets, plants, rodents, and insects will raise the level of biological contamination.

=== Sheath air ===
Sheath air is clean filtered air that surrounds the aerosol stream to prevent particulates from circulating or depositing within the optic chamber. Sheath air prevents contamination caused by build-up and deposits, improves response time by containing the sample, and improves maintenance by keeping the optic chamber clean. The nephelometer creates the sheath air by passing air through a zero filter before beginning the sample.

=== Global radiation balance ===
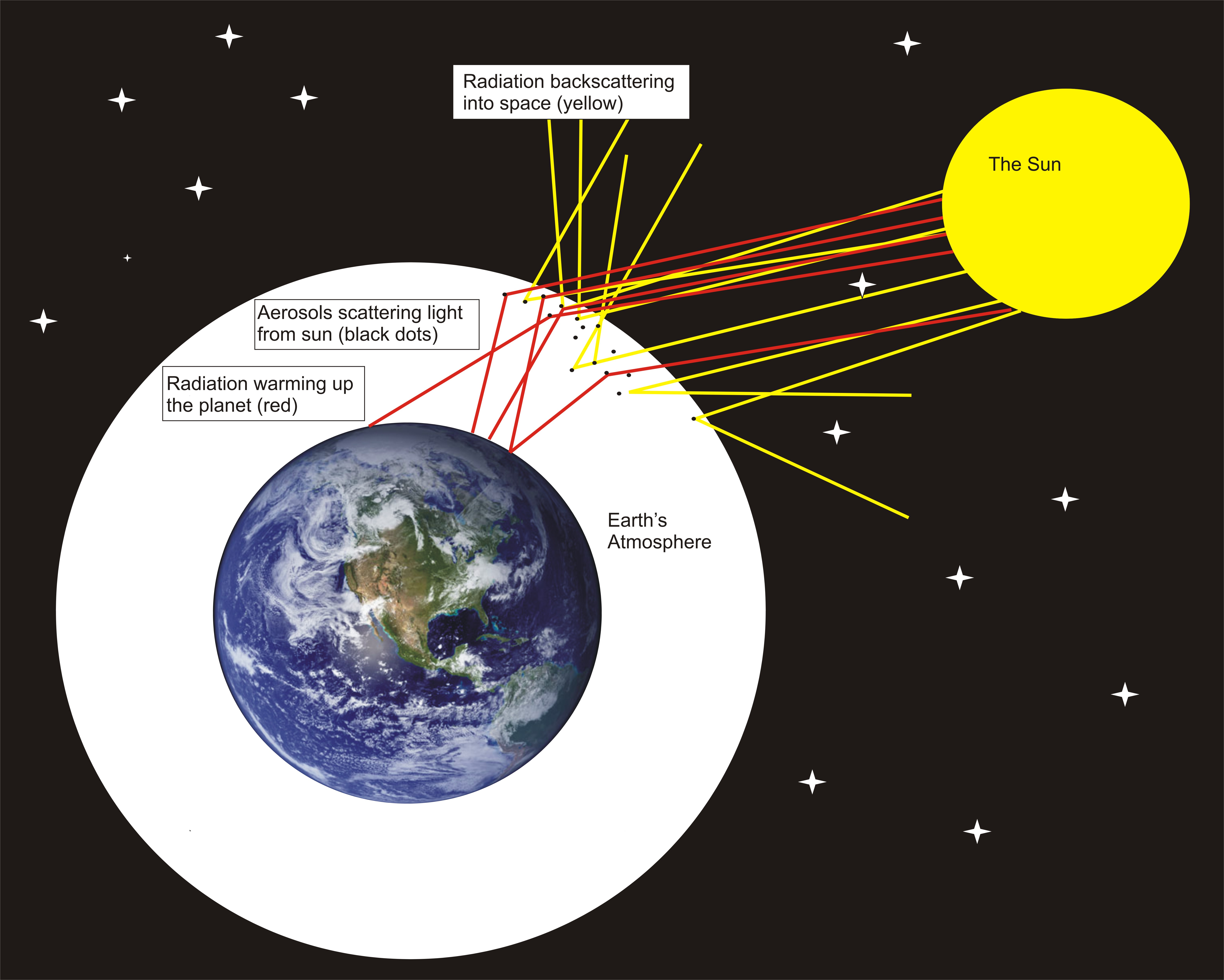
Radiation balance (thickness of Earth's atmosphere is greatly exaggerated).

Nephelometers are also used in global warming studies, specifically measuring the global radiation balance. Three wavelength nephelometers fitted with a backscatter shutter can determine the amount of solar radiation that is reflected back into space by dust and particulate matter. This reflected light influences the amount of radiation reaching the earth's lower atmosphere and warming the planet.

=== Visibility ===
Nephelometers are also used for measurement of visibility with simple one-wavelength nephelometers used throughout the world by many EPAs. Nephelometers, through the measurement of light scattering, can determine visibility in distance through the application of a conversion factor called Koschmieder's formula.

=== Medicine ===
In medicine, nephelometry is used to measure immune function. It is also used in clinical microbiology, for preparation of a standardized inoculum (McFarland suspension) for antimicrobial susceptibility testing.

=== Fire detection ===
Gas-phase nephelometers are also used in the detection of smoke and other particles of combustion. In such use, the apparatus is referred to as an aspirated smoke detector. These have the capability to detect extremely low particle concentrations (to 0.005%) and are therefore highly suitable to protecting sensitive or valuable electronic equipment, such as mainframe computers and telephone switches.

== Turbidity units ==
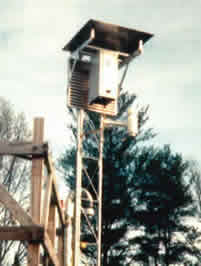
A nephelometer installation at Acadia National Park

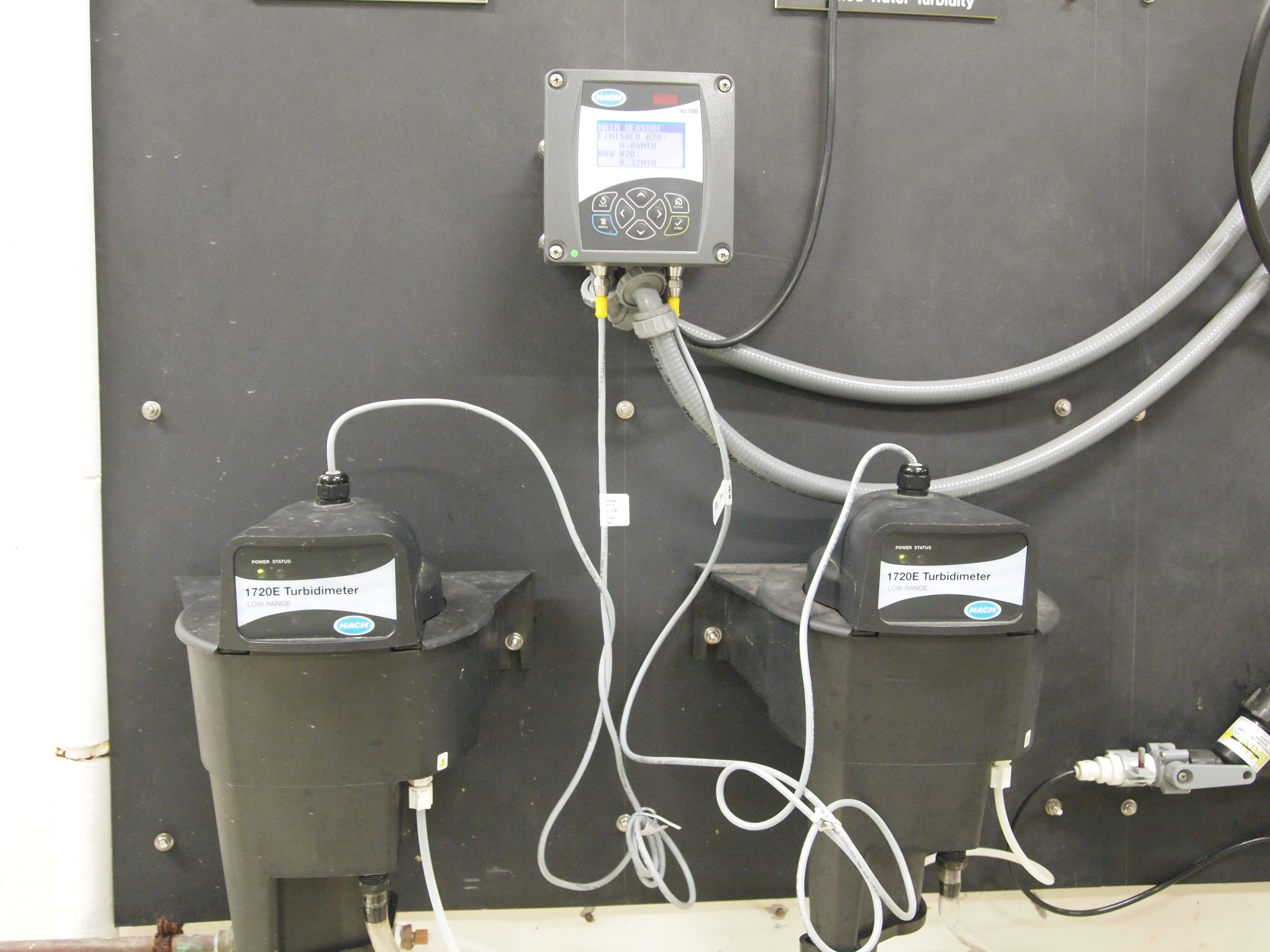
Turbidimeters used at a water purification plant to measure turbidity (in NTU) of raw water and clear water after filtration

- Because optical properties depend on suspended particle size, a stable synthetic material called "Formazin" with uniform particle size is often used as a standard for calibration and reproducibility. The unit is called Formazin Turbidity Unit (FTU).
- Nephelometric Turbidity Units (NTU) specified by United States Environmental Protection Agency is a special case of FTU, where a white light source and certain geometrical properties of the measurement apparatus are specified. (Sometimes the alternate form "nephelos turbidity units" is used)
- Formazin Nephelometric Units (FNU), prescribed for 9 measurements of turbidity in water treatment by ISO 7027, another special case of FTU with near infrared light (NIR) and 90° scatter.
- Formazin Attenuation Units (FAU) specified by ISO 7027 for water treatment standards for turbidity measurements at 0°, also a special case of FTU.
- Formazin Backscatter Units (FBU), not part of a standard, is the unit of optical backscatter detectors (OBS), measured at c. 180°, also a special case of FTU.
- European Brewery Convention (EBC) turbidity units
- Concentration Units (C.U.)
- Optical Density (O.D.)
- Jackson "Candle" Turbidity Units (JTU; an early measure)
- Helms Units
- American Society of Brewing Chemists (ASBC-FTU) turbidity units
- Brantner Haze Scale (BHS) and Brantner Haze Units (BHU) for purposefully hazy beer
- Parts Per Million of standard substance, such as PPM/DE (Kieselguhr)
- "Trübungseinheit/Formazin" (TE/F) a German standard, now replaced by the FNU unit.
- diatomaceous earth ("ppm SiO_{2}") an older standard, now obsolete

A more popular term for this instrument in water quality testing is a turbidimeter. However, there can be differences between models of turbidimeters, depending upon the arrangement (geometry) of the source beam and the detector. A nephelometric turbidimeter always monitors light reflected off the particles and not attenuation due to cloudiness. In the United States environmental monitoring the turbidity standard unit is called Nephelometric Turbidity Units (NTU), while the international standard unit is called Formazin Nephelometric Unit (FNU). The most generally applicable unit is Formazin Turbidity Unit (FTU), although different measurement methods can give quite different values as reported in FTU (see below).

Gas-phase nephelometers are also used to study the atmosphere. These can provide information on visibility and atmospheric albedo.

== See also ==
- ISO 7027
- Water purification
