= Georgy Babakin =

Soviet aerospace engineer

- Георгий Бабакин
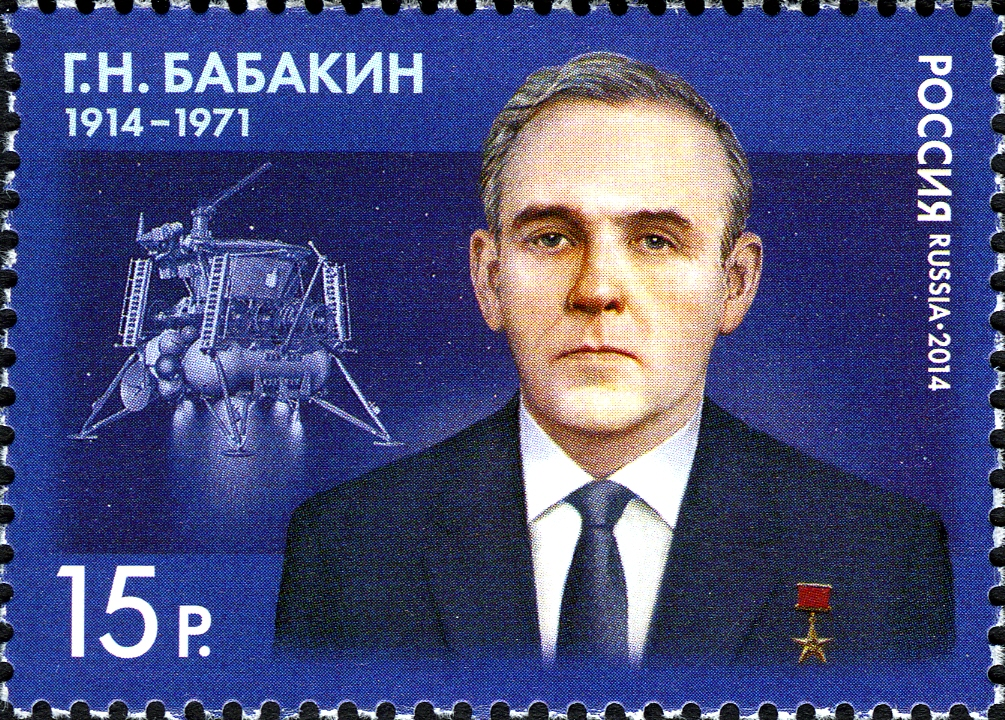
- Babakin on a 2014 Russian stamp
- Born: 13 November 1914; Moscow, Moscow Governorate, Russian Empire
- Died: 3 August 1971 (aged 56); Moscow, Russian SFSR, Soviet Union
- Citizenship: USSR
- Known for: Lunokhod-1
- Scientific career
- Fields: Engineering (Controls)
- Institutions: Institute of Automation (VSNITO), Lavochkin

Georgy Nikolayevich Babakin (Russian: Гео́ргий Никола́евич Баба́кин; 13 November 1914 – 3 August 1971) was a Soviet engineer working in the space program. He was Chief Designer at the Lavochkin Design Bureau from 1965 until his death.

Babakin's early career was spent in radio engineering, starting with a job at the Moscow telephone company in 1930, working on an urban radio network. From 1943 to 1949, Babakin worked on radar targeting systems at the Institute of Automation (VSNITO), where he became its chief engineer.

Babakin became involved in the Soviet space program in 1949, working in Boris Chertok's division of NII-88 on surface-to-air missiles and targeting systems. In 1952, he was part of a group transferred to Lavochkin's bureau OKB-301 to work on the intercontinental cruise missile Burya and the V-300 anti-aircraft missile.

In 1960, Semyon Lavochkin died at an aircraft show (literally died in Babakin's arms), and the bureau was subsumed by Vladimir Chelomei. It became independent again in 1965, with Babakin as its chief designer. At that time, the planetary probe program was taken away from Sergei Korolev's OKB-1 bureau and reassigned to OKB-301 due to its almost complete lack of success (not one Soviet planetary probe had succeeded since Luna 3 six years earlier).

Babakin's new "NPO Lavochkin" brought improved engineering, testing and systems management to this problem, including proper bench and dynamics testing of components, something Korolev had never done. The effort began to bear fruit with the successful missions of Luna 9 and Venera 4 in 1966-67.

Babakin died of a heart attack at the age of 56 shortly before the completion of the Mars 2 and Mars 3 spacecraft, during Lunokhod-1 mission. His bureau continued with a series of impressive successes, the first Lunar rovers, landings on Venus and robotic sample return of Moon rocks. A research division of NPO Lavochkin is named after Babakin, and the firm continues to design and build spacecraft.

The crater Babakin on the Moon and Babakin on Mars were named in his honor. The Babakin Space Centre is named after him.

The G.N. Babakin Medal was established by the Russian Federation of Cosmonautics on December 6, 1996.

== Awards ==
- Order of the Red Banner of Labor (1956)
- Lenin Prize (1966)
- Hero of Socialist Labor (1970)
- Order of Lenin (1970)
- Medal of the National Centre for Space Studies of France

== Literature ==
- "Rockets and people" – B. E. Chertok, M: "mechanical engineering", 1999. ISBN 5-217-02942-0 (in Russian)
- A.I. Ostashev, Sergey Pavlovich Korolyov – The Genius of the 20th Century — 2010 M. of Public Educational Institution of Higher Professional Training MGUL ISBN 978-5-8135-0510-2.
- "S. P. Korolev. Encyclopedia of life and creativity" – edited by C. A. Lopota, RSC Energia. S. P. Korolev, 2014 ISBN 978-5-906674-04-3
