= Babakin (lunar crater) =

Crater on the Moon

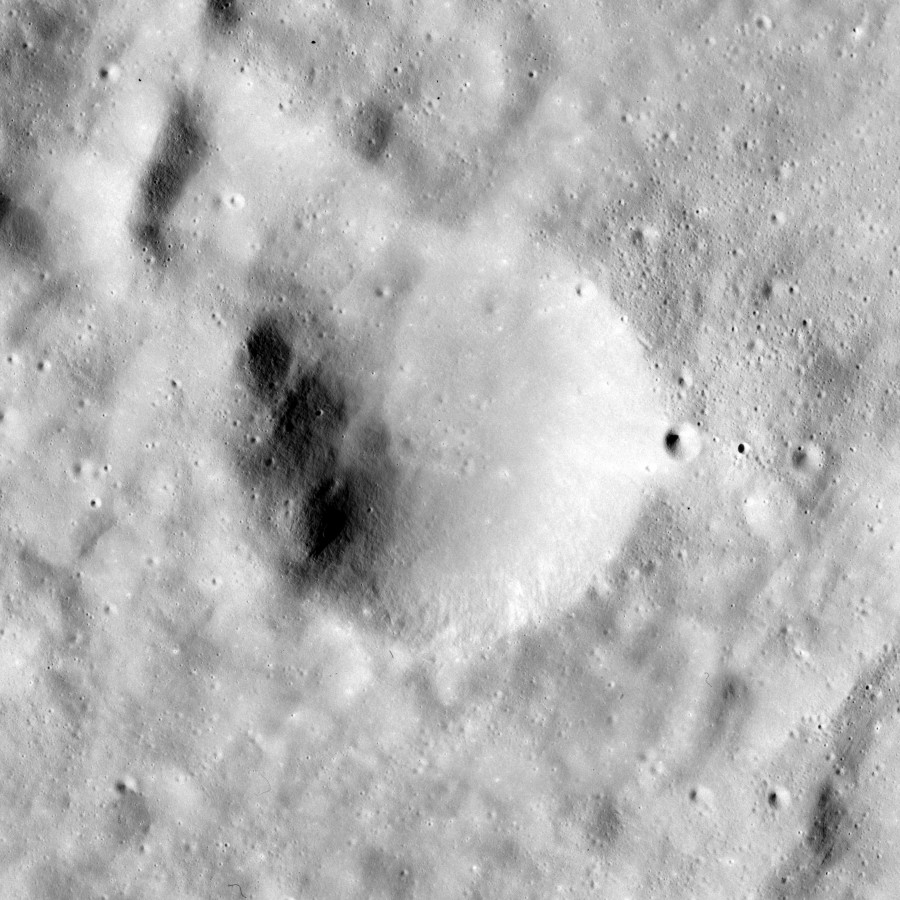
- Apollo 15 image
- Coordinates: 20.81°S 123.26°E
- Diameter: 19.15 km (11.90 mi)
- Depth: Unknown
- Colongitude: 237° at sunrise
- Eponym: Georgy Babakin

Babakin is a small lunar impact crater that is located in the southern part of the walled basin Fermi on the far side of the Moon. The crater was named by the IAU in 1973, after Soviet space scientist Georgy Babakin (1914–1971).

The crater rim is symmetrical, circular and sharp-edged, with only some minor erosion and a slight depression along the northern edge. The interior walls slope downward gently toward the center. The infrared spectrum of pure crystalline plagioclase has been identified on the south wall.
