= ISO 7027 =

ISO standard

ISO 7027:1999 is an ISO standard for water quality that enables the determination of turbidity. The ISO 7027 technique is used to determine the concentration of suspended particles in a sample of water by measuring the incident light scattered at right angles from the sample. The scattered light is captured by a photodiode, which produces an electronic signal that is converted to a turbidity.
