= Babakin Space Centre =

Soviet-Russian research institute

The Babakin Science and Research Space Centre (Russian: Научно-испытательный центр имени Г.Н. Бабакина) is a division of the Lavochkin Design Bureau based in Khimki, Russia. It is managed by them on behalf of Roscosmos. It is named after Georgy N. Babakin, chief designer of the Lavochkin Association from 1965 to 1971.

Its task is to probe space through uncrewed lunar and planetary missions. The spacecraft of the Kosmos 1 mission was built at the centre.

== See also ==
- Titov Main Test and Space Systems Control Centre
