= Hit the Road (TV series) =

American comedy television series

- Genre: Sitcom
- Created by: Jason Alexander; Peter Tilden; Dean Craig
- Starring: Jason Alexander; Amy Pietz; Natalie Sharp; Nick Marini; Tim Johnson Jr.; Maddie Dixon-Poirier
- Composer: Jeff Toyne
- Country of origin: United States
- Original language: English
- No. of seasons: 1
- No. of episodes: 10

Production
- Executive producers: Jason Alexander; Peter Tilden; Dean Craig; Bart Peters; Chris Long; Shane Elrod; Mark Burg; David Guillod; Henrik Bastin; Melissa Aouate
- Producers: Kate Regan; Jonathan I. Schwartz
- Running time: 28–30 minutes
- Production companies: Primary Wave Entertainment; Fabrik Entertainment

Original release
- Network: Audience
- Release: October 17 – December 19, 2017

Hit the Road is an American sitcom created by Jason Alexander, Peter Tilden and Dean Craig. The series stars Jason Alexander, Amy Pietz, Natalie Sharp, Nick Marini, Tim Johnson Jr. and Maddie Dixon-Poirier. The series premiered on Audience on October 17, 2017.

On December 31, 2017, Alexander confirmed on his official Twitter account that the series would not return for a second season.

== Cast and characters ==
=== Main ===
- Jason Alexander as Ken Swallow
- Amy Pietz as Meg Swallow
- Natalie Sharp as Ria Swallow
- Nick Marini as Alex Swallow
- Tim Johnson Jr. as Jermaine Swallow
- Maddie Dixon-Poirier as Casey Swallow

=== Recurring ===
- Maddie Phillips as Girl Alex
- Christian Sloan as Bailor
- Jerry Wasserman as Gary Vestimonte
- Siobhan Williams as Carissa
- Elfina Luk as Dr. Helen Nguyen
- Samantha Ferris as Linda
- Ian Collins as Luke

== Episodes ==
No.	Title	Directed by	Written by	Original release date
1	"Nothing's Gonna Stop Us Now"	Jerry Levine	Dean Craig	October 17, 2017
2	"Just the Two of Us"	Jerry Levine	Brendan Casey	October 24, 2017
3	"Jammin'"	Jerry Levine	Maxwell Vivian	October 31, 2017
4	"School Spirit"	Jerry Levine	Bobby Bowman	November 7, 2017
5	"Gone Daddy, Gone"	Jerry Levine	Jason Alexander, Peter Tilden & Maxwell Vivian	November 14, 2017
6	"Tears on My Pillow"	Jerry Levine	Jason Alexander, Peter Tilden & Dean Craig	November 21, 2017
7	"It's My Party"	Jerry Levine	Warren Lieberstein	November 28, 2017
8	"Rehab"	Jerry Levine	Bobby Bowman & Maxwell Vivian	December 5, 2017
9	"Kush"	Jerry Levine	Brendan Casey & Jesse Vincent	December 12, 2017
10	"Miracles Happen Every Day"	Jerry Levine	Dean Craig	December 19, 2017
