= Dean Craig =

British film director and screenwriter

- Born: 25 October 1974 (age 51); London, England
- Occupations: screenwriter film director
- Years active: 2004–present
- Known for: Death at a Funeral; Moonwalkers

Dean Craig (born 25 October 1974) is an English screenwriter and film director. In addition to his film work, Craig wrote the BBC television series Off the Hook.

== Early life ==
He was educated at The Haberdashers' Aske's Boys' School, an independent school in Elstree in Hertfordshire.

== Career ==
Craig began as a script reader and script editor for Working Title, BBC Films, and Miramax, before heading to New York University to take a summer filmmaking program in 2002. He wrote on his first feature screenplay Caffeine. He then wrote Death at a Funeral, which would later be remade in 2009 (Bollywood), 2010, in 2025 (Spain) and in 2026 (Italy). He has taught screenwriting at the London Film School.

== Filmography ==
- The Estate (2022) - Director/Writer
- The Honeymoon (2022) - Director/Writer
- Love, Wedding, Repeat (2020) - Director/Writer
- My Dog Stupid (2019) - Writer
- Hit the Road (2017, TV series) - Writer
- A Few Less Men (2017) - Writer
- Carrie Pilby (2016) - Writer
- Moonwalkers (2015) - Writer
- A Few Best Men (2012) - Writer
- Death at a Funeral (2010) - Writer
- Off the Hook (2009, TV series) - Writer
- Death at a Funeral (2007) - Writer
- Caffeine (2006) - Writer
