= Moonwalkers (film) =

2015 British-American comedy film by Antoine Bardou-Jacquet

- Theatrical release poster
- Directed by: Antoine Bardou-Jacquet
- Written by: Dean Craig
- Produced by: Georges Bermann
- Starring: Ron Perlman; Rupert Grint; Robert Sheehan
- Cinematography: Glynn Speeckaert
- Edited by: Bill Smedley
- Production companies: Partizan Films; Nexus Factory; Potemkino
- Distributed by: Alchemy
- Release dates: March 14, 2015 (SXSW); January 15, 2016 (United States)
- Running time: 107 minutes
- Country: United Kingdom
- Language: English
- Box office: $135,622

Moonwalkers is a 2015 British crime comedy film directed by debut director Antoine Bardou-Jacquet, written by Dean Craig, and starring Ron Perlman, Rupert Grint and Robert Sheehan. The film, which is based on Moon landing conspiracy theories, had its world premiere at SXSW on March 14, 2015. It had a limited release on January 15, 2016, and was available through video on demand by Alchemy.

== Plot ==
In the days leading up to the Apollo 11 Moon landing, CIA agent Tom Kidman is tasked with hiring Stanley Kubrick to film a fake moonwalk, in the event the astronauts fail in their mission. The CIA views the Moon landing as a potential ideological victory over the Soviet Union, necessary for American morale. The CIA gives Kidman a large sum of cash as an incentive for Kubrick, and orders him to murder Kubrick when the film is complete to prevent the story from leaking. Unbeknownst to the CIA, Kidman is suffering from post-traumatic stress disorder due to his time in Vietnam and responds to any frustration with extreme violence.

Kidman travels to England to speak with Kubrick's agent, only to accidentally hold a meeting with the agent's cousin, Jonny Thorpe, a struggling band promoter in debt to an East End gangster named the Iron Monger. Jonny agrees to arrange a sit-down between Kidman and Kubrick, then convinces his stoner roommate Leon to pose as the director. Leon and Kidman meet, and Jonny accepts the briefcase of money, promising the movie will be made. Thinking Kidman is simply a Hollywood producer, the pair go on a spending spree before the Iron Monger's henchman break into Jonny's house, beat him, and steal the briefcase.

Later, Kidman sees Stanley Kubrick on television and realizes that he's been duped. He confronts Jonny, who confesses his scheme. Seeing an opportunity to establish himself as a success, Jonny promises that a friend of his, a director named Renatus, can film a fake Moon landing. Jonny takes Kidman to meet Renatus at the director's mansion, which he has turned into a commune. Thinking he's being hired for an art project, Renatus accepts. Meanwhile, a hippie girl named Ella takes an interest in Kidman.

Kidman takes Jonny to confront the Iron Monger and get the briefcase of money back. Rather than negotiate with the Iron Monger, Kidman murders several of his henchmen and takes the briefcase back. Production is stalled when Renatus insists on approaching the film as a piece of performance art, intending to include several artistic flourishes. To show off his alleged immunity to marijuana, Kidman takes a hit from a bong, which turns out to have been laced with opium. To help him recover from its effects, Ella gives him LSD, sending Kidman on a bad trip, after which he has sex with Ella. In the throes of his trip, Kidman tells Ella and Leon he no longer feels compelled to solve his problems with violence. Afterwards, he makes an incoherent call to the CIA, attempting to update them on his status.

Alarmed by Kidman's call, the CIA sends several agents to England. They take the commune hostage and force everyone to begin filming the fake Moon landing. Jonny and Leon take on the roles of the astronauts; Leon, nervous at the prospect of being on television, gets high and begins having a trip on set, stumbling around the fake Moon surface. The Iron Monger's gang arrive and engage in a deadly shootout with the CIA. During this the fake footage is relayed to CIA headquarters where they are shocked by the badly acted moon landing recreation. Jonny goes to help Kidman defeat the Iron Monger gang but only manages to distract the last CIA agent who is about to kill Kidman. After Kidman kills the Iron Monger and the last CIA operative, he lies to a dazed Jonny saying 'you got him'.

Now wanted by the CIA, Jonny, Leon, Kidman, and Ella flee England. A montage shows news clips of American life through the 1960s, culminating with Apollo 11 reaching the Moon. In Spain, Jonny, Leon, Ella and Kidman enter a bar in time to watch the Moon landing with several villagers where they are unable to tell if they are watching the real or fake footage.

== Cast ==
- Ron Perlman as Tom Kidman
- Rupert Grint as Jonny Thorpe
- Robert Sheehan as Leon
- Eric Lampaert as Glen
- Tom Audenaert as Renatus
- Kerry Shale as Mr. White
- John Flanders as CIA Agent Murphy
- Andrew Blumenthal as Kozinsky
- Jay Benedict as Colonel Dickford
- Kevin Bishop as Paul
- James Cosmo as Dawson
- Stephen Campbell Moore as Derek Kaye
- Erika Sainte as Ella

== Production ==
In June 2014, it was announced that Ron Perlman, Rupert Grint, Robert Sheehan, Stephen Campbell Moore, Kevin Bishop and James Cosmo had joined the cast of the film. It was also announced Antoine Bardou-Jacquet would be directing the film, from a screenplay by Dean Craig. It was also announced Kinology had signed on to finance the film and handle international sales. Principal photography began on May 14, 2014.

== Release ==
The film premiered at South by Southwest on March 14, 2015. On March 16, 2015, Alchemy picked up distribution rights to the film. The film was released in the United States on January 15, 2016, in a limited release and through video on demand.

== Critical reception ==
Moonwalkers received mixed reviews from film critics. It holds a 42% "Rotten" rating on review aggregator website Rotten Tomatoes, based on 38 reviews, with an average score of 5.06/10. On Metacritic, the film holds a rating of 39 out of 100, based on 10 critics, indicating "generally unfavorable reviews".

John DeFore of The Hollywood Reporter gave the film a mixed review writing: "Too much faith has been put in the comic value of Dean Craig's screenplay, which offers plenty of mishaps and shocking violent outbursts, but not so many laughs. Aside from a look at Renatus's pretentiously goofy most recent film, the funniest thing here is the most predictable scene, a sequence in which crew-cut, all-business Kidman gets dosed with acid. For a moment, Johnny turns into the grown-up of the bunch — a terrifying prospect for a plan that was counting on having a perfectionist cinematic genius at the helm." Susan Wloszczyna of RogerEbert.com gave the film a negative review, writing: "Forget a fake moon landing. "Moonwalkers" is a fake comedy, one that mistakes an endless bloody splatter-fest of a finale for the height of hilarity and never quite gets off the ground after takeoff."

== See also ==
- Apollo 11 in popular culture
