= Thomas Baron (disambiguation) =

Thomas Baron (c. 1938–1967) was an American aviation safety inspector.

Thomas Baron may also refer to:

- Thomas Baron (MP), MP for Newcastle-under-Lyme in 1421
- Tommy T. Baron, stage name of Tommy Vetterli from Coroner

== See also ==
- Thomas Barron (disambiguation)
