= Astronauts Gone Wild =

2004 film by Bart Sibrel

Astronauts Gone Wild: An Investigation Into the Authenticity of the Moon Landings
- Directed by: Bart Sibrel
- Produced by: Bart Sibrel
- Distributed by: AFTH, LLC
- Release date: 2004
- Running time: 53 minutes
- Country: United States
- Language: English

Astronauts Gone Wild: Investigation Into the Authenticity of the Moon Landings is a 2004 pseudo-documentary produced and directed by Bart Sibrel, a Nashville-based videographer who claims that the six Apollo Moon landings in the 1960s and 1970s were elaborate hoaxes. Sibrel made this video as a follow-up to his 2001 video A Funny Thing Happened on the Way to the Moon, which accuses NASA of falsifying the Apollo 11 mission photography. The title of the presentation is a wordplay on the Girls Gone Wild video series.

== Encounters with astronauts ==
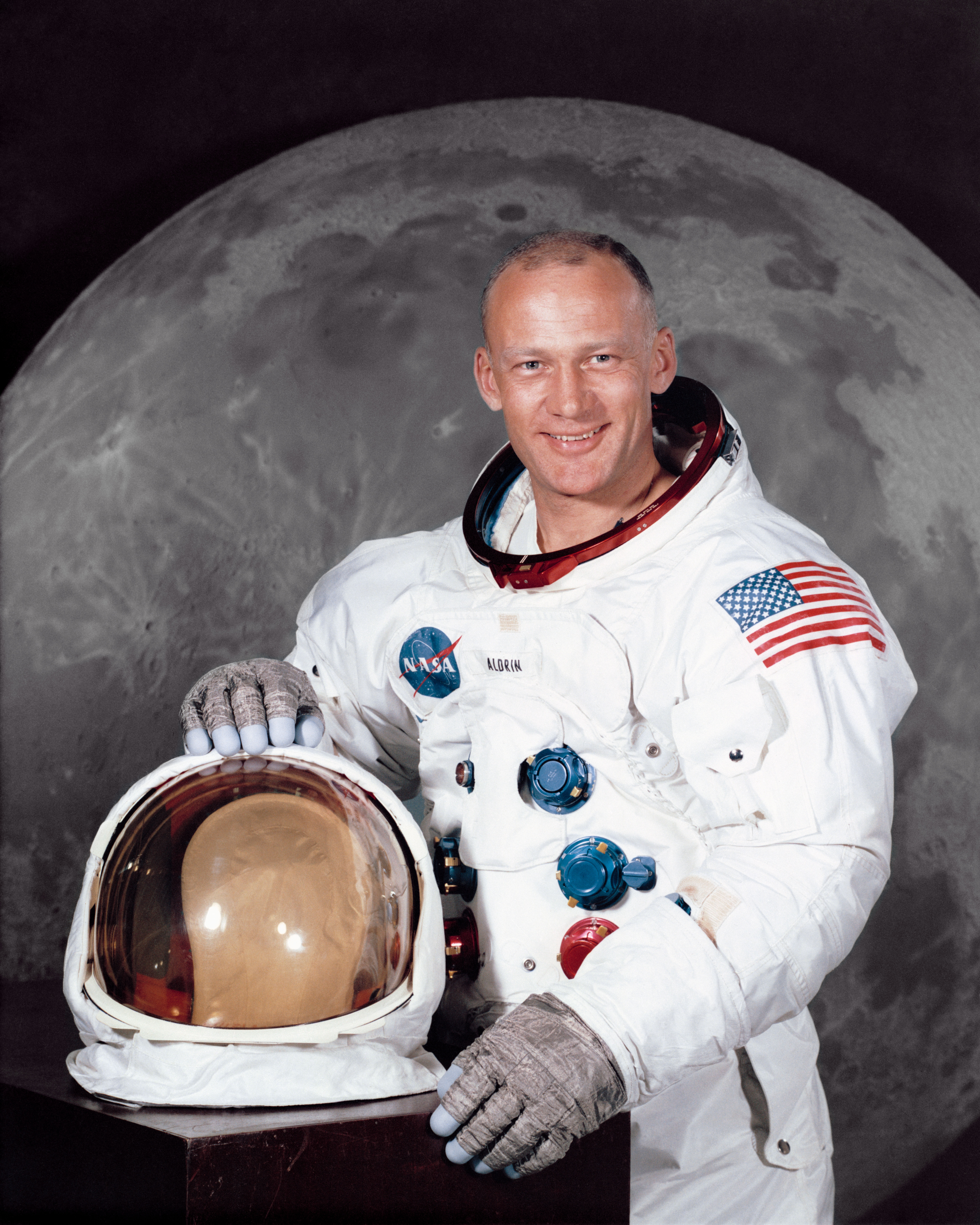
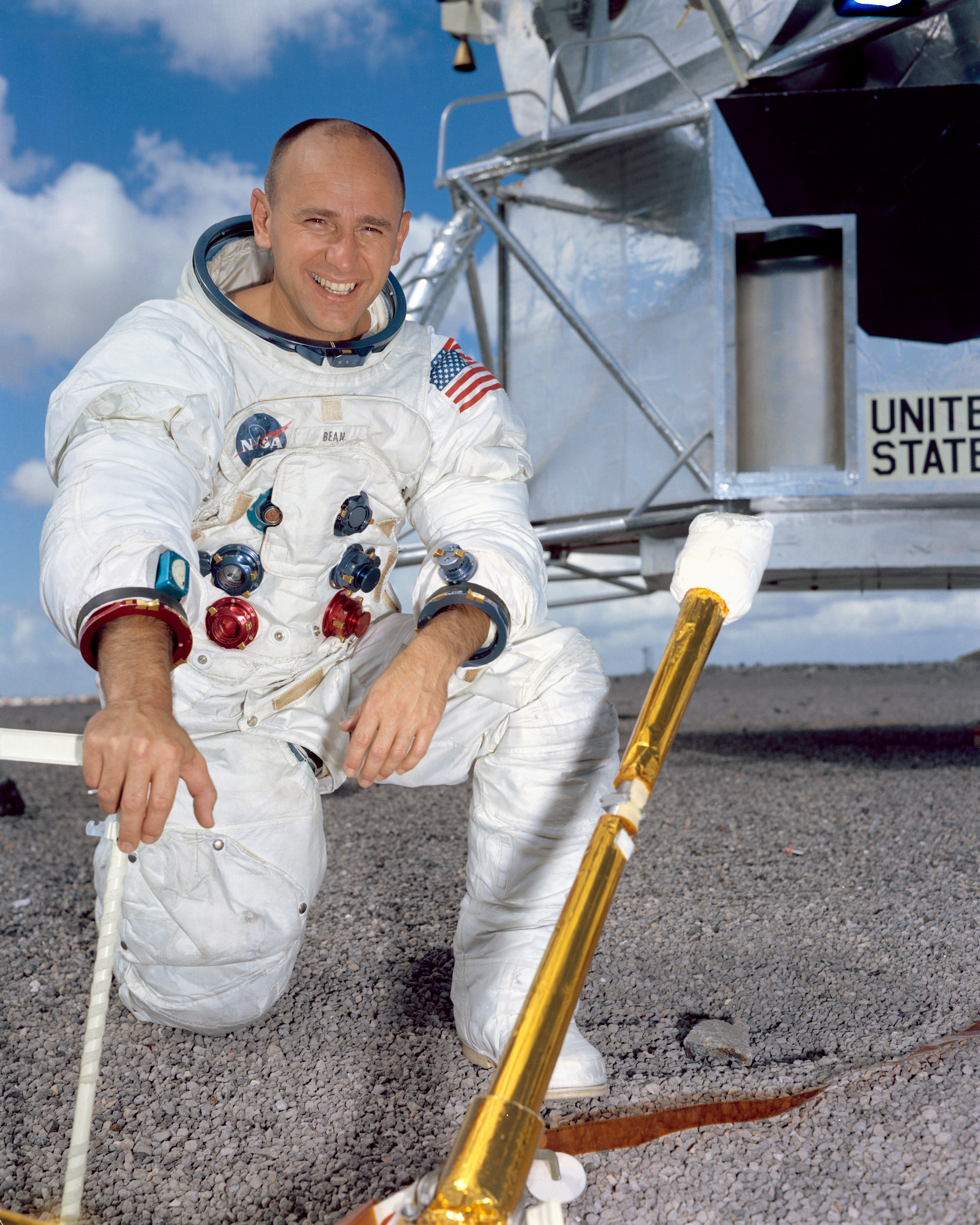
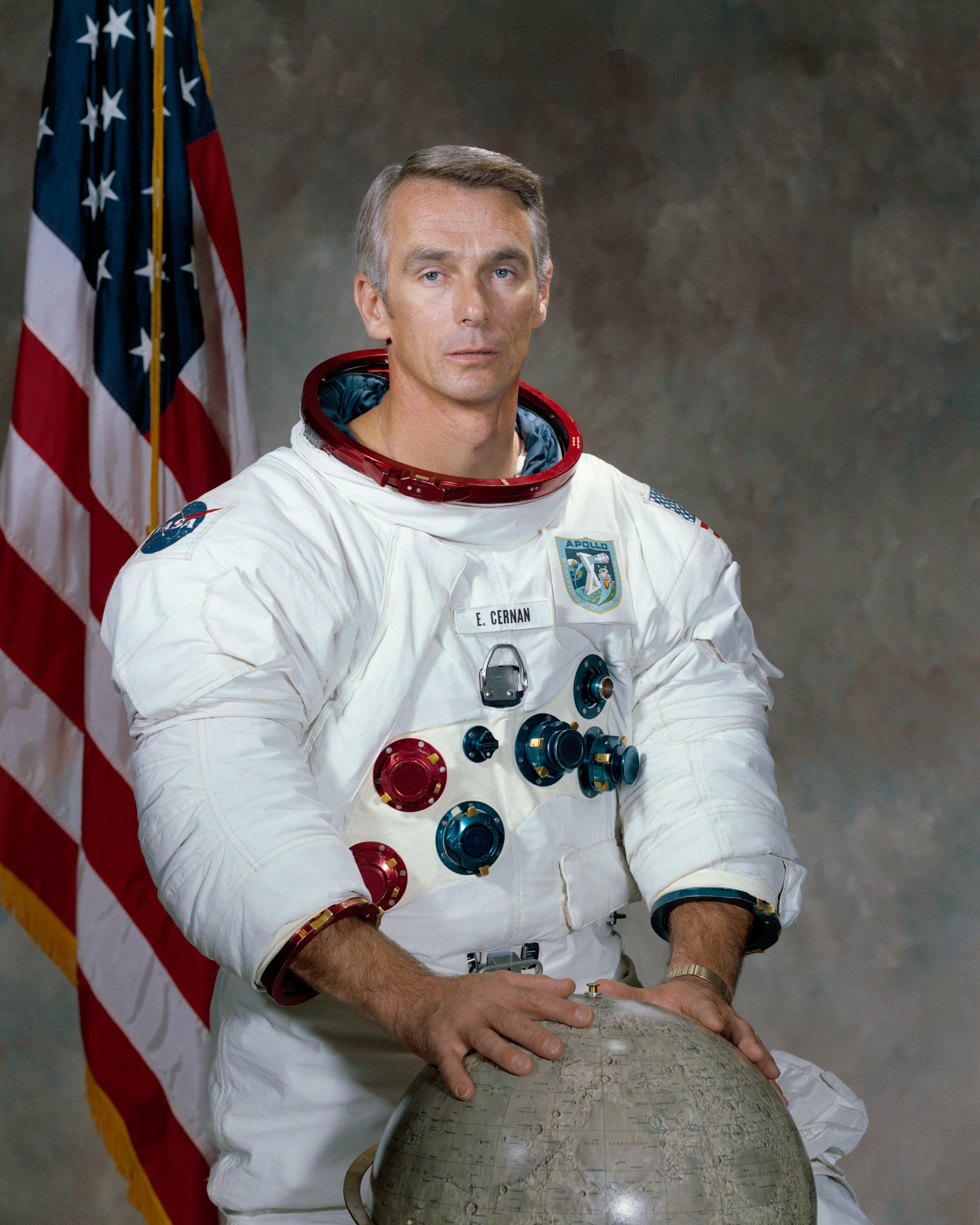
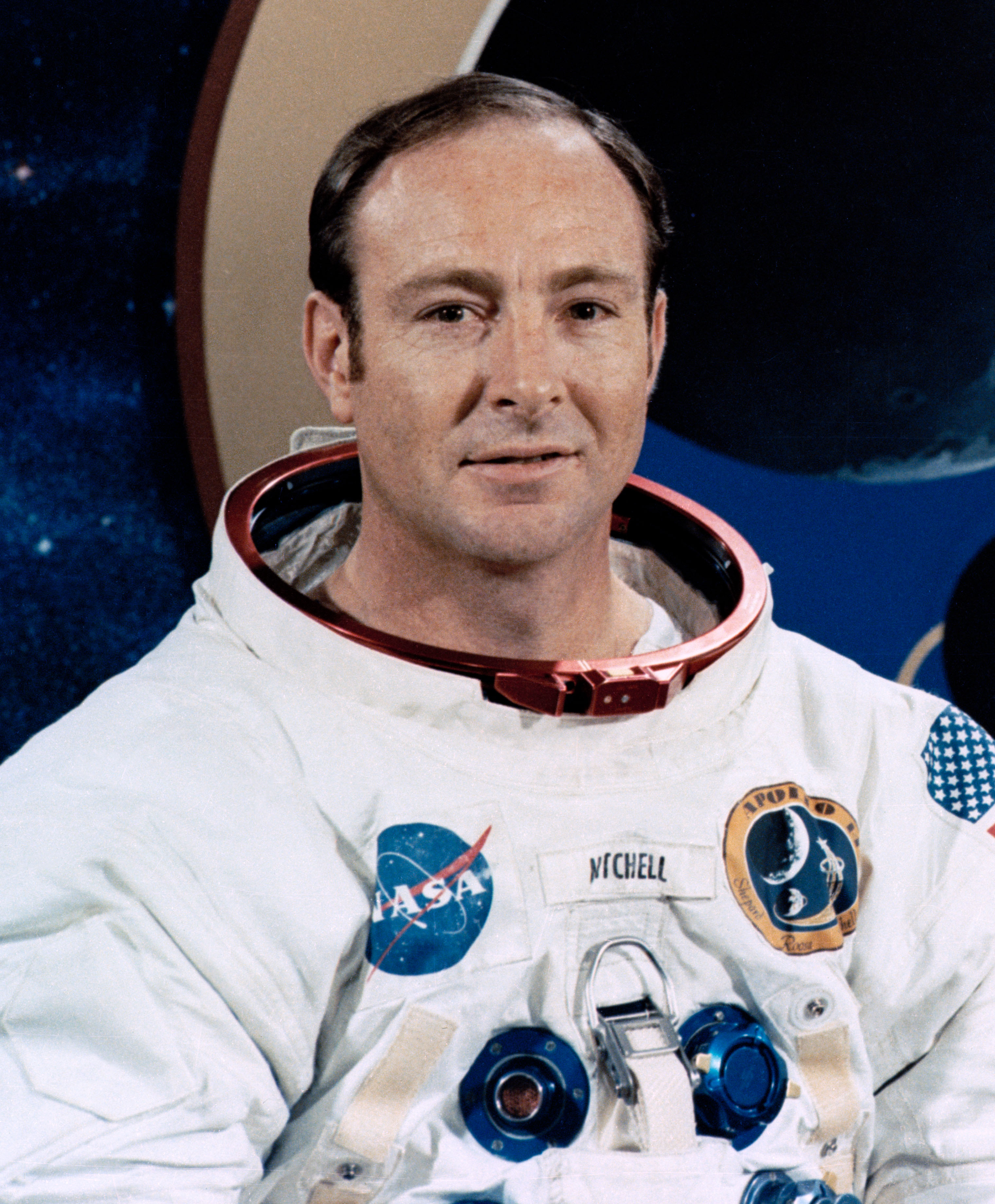
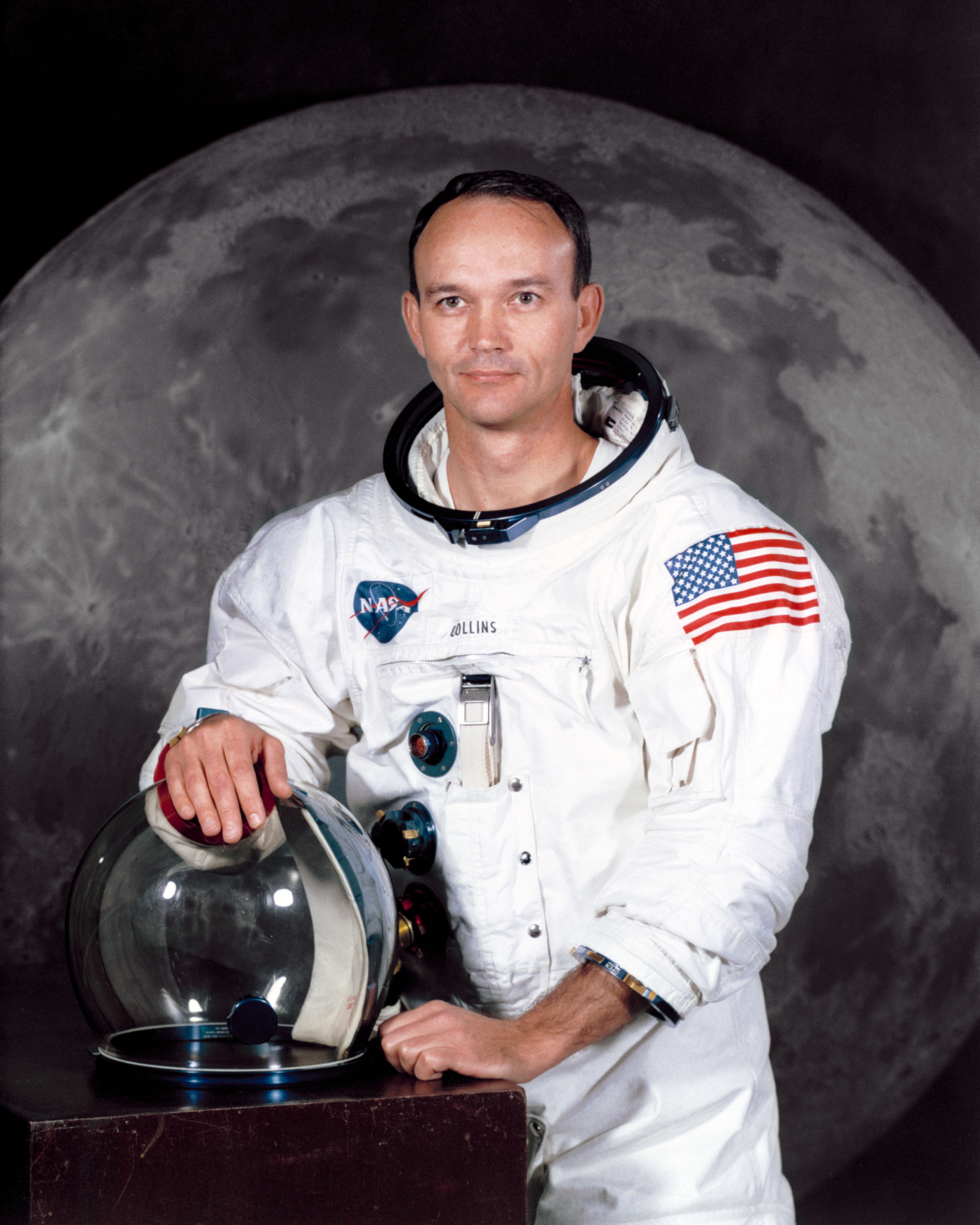
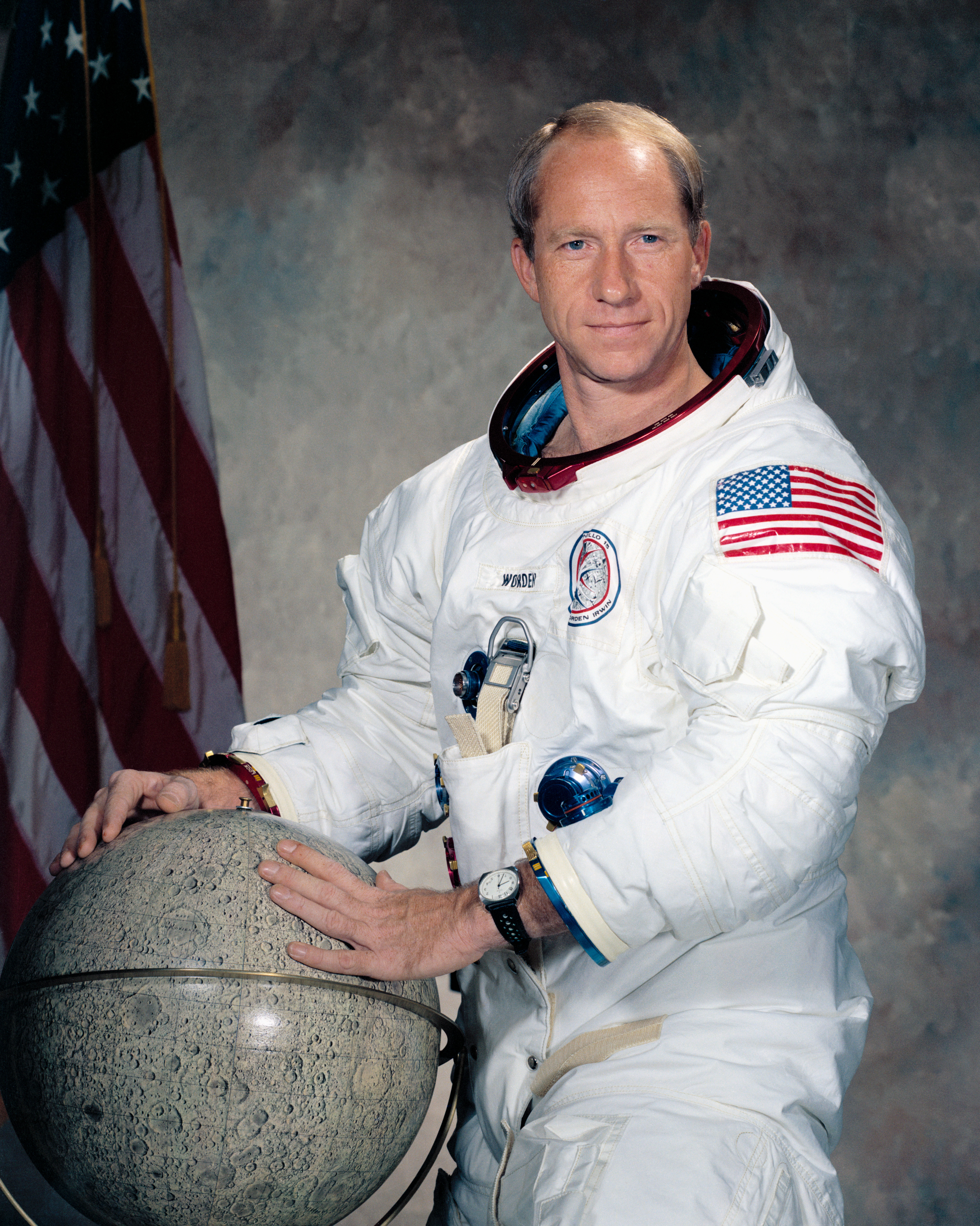
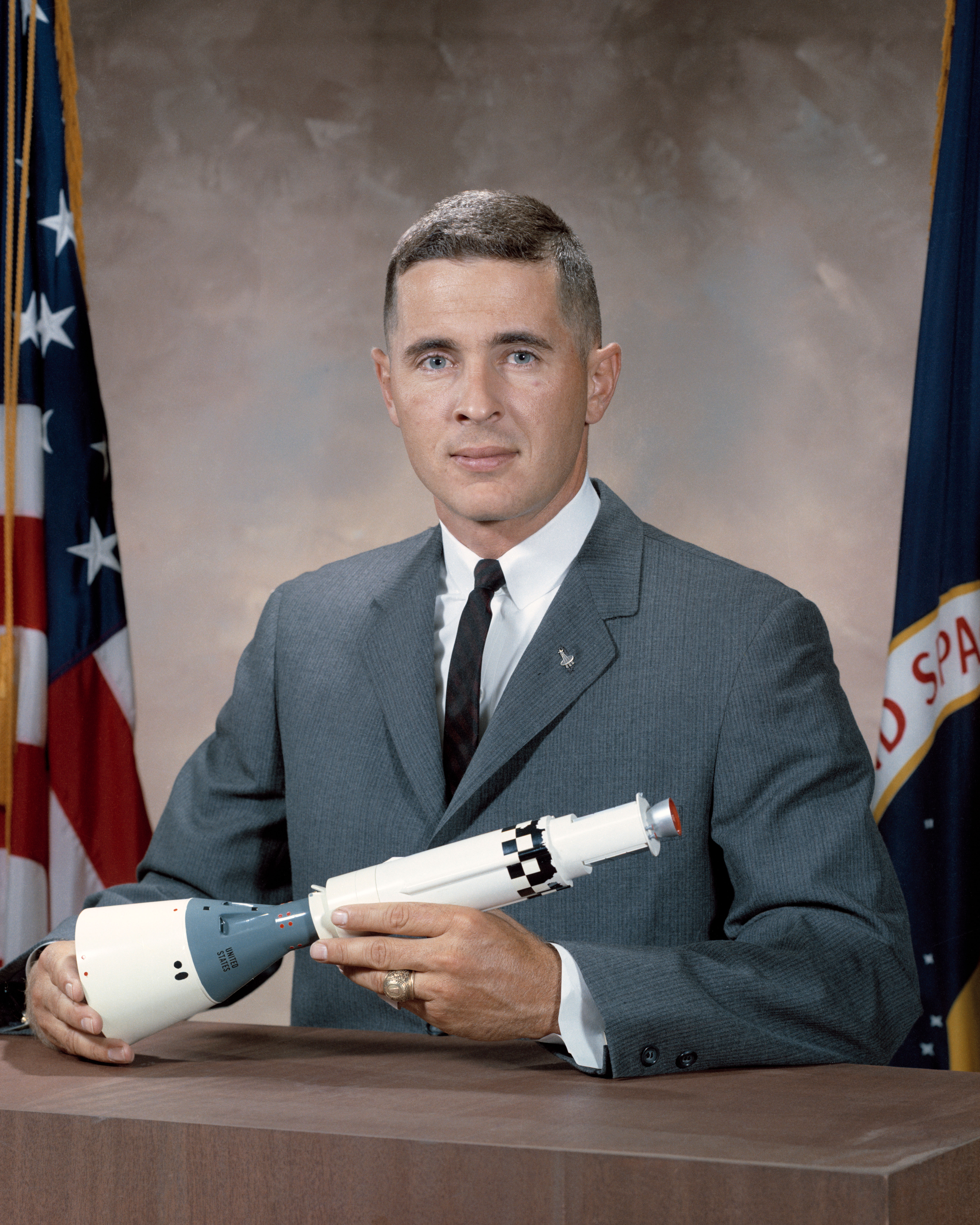
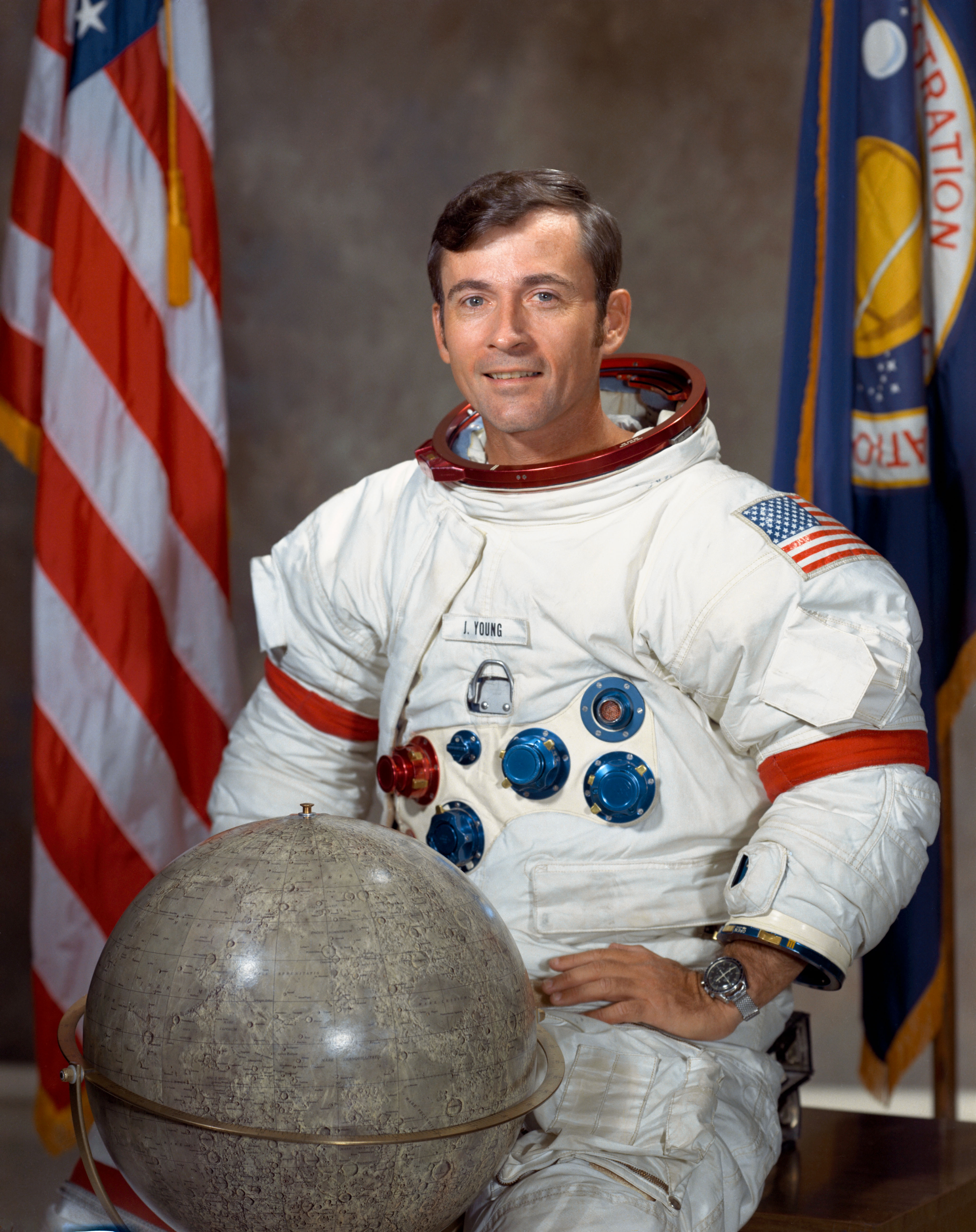
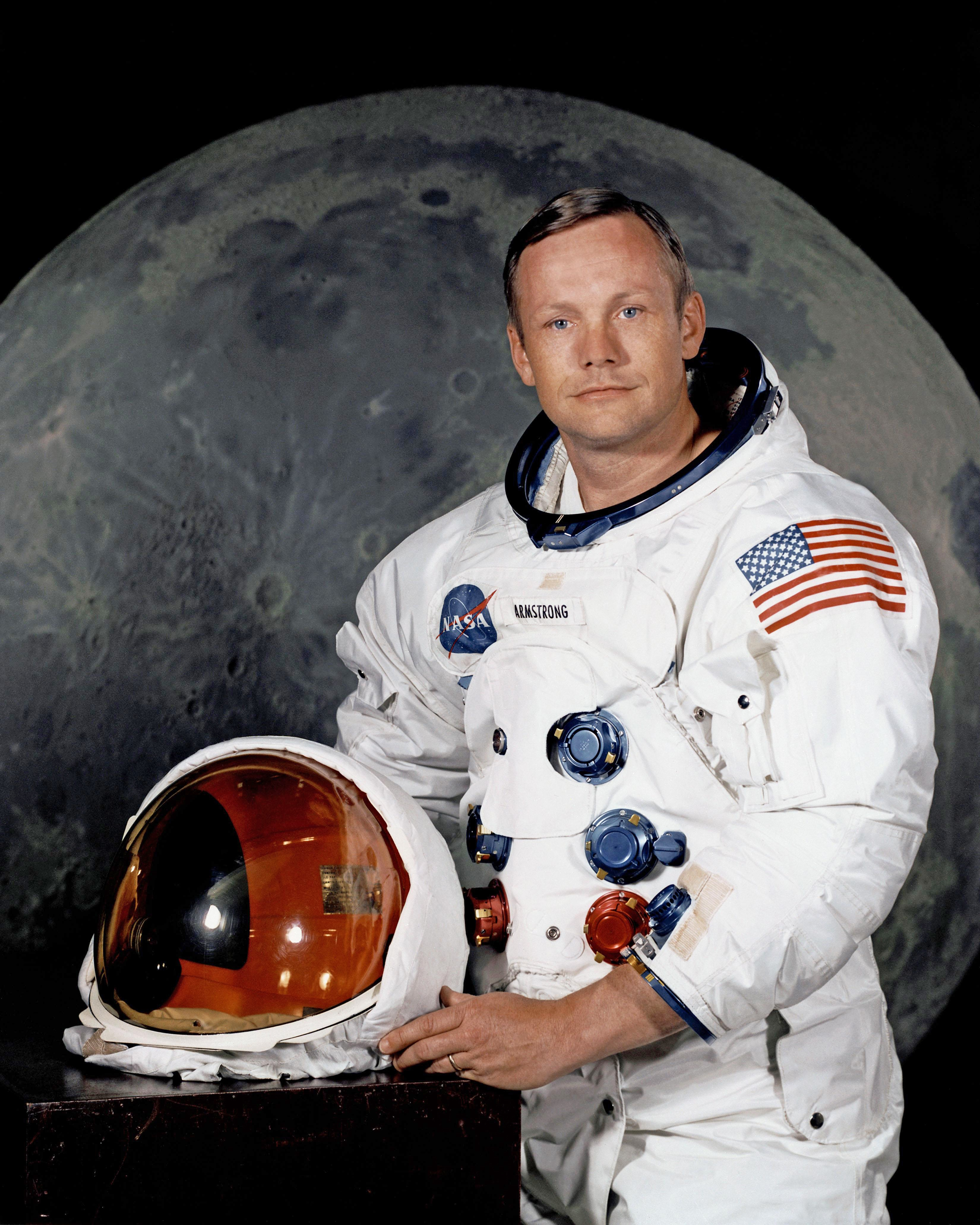
All of the nine astronauts Bart Sibrel encountered were Buzz Aldrin, Alan Bean, Gene Cernan, Edgar Mitchell, Michael Collins, Alfred Worden, William Anders, John Young, and Neil Armstrong.

In Astronauts Gone Wild, Sibrel confronts nine Apollo astronauts and asks them to swear an oath on a Bible that they traveled to the Moon and back.

=== Buzz Aldrin ===
Sibrel's first encounter is with the Apollo 11 crewmember Buzz Aldrin. Inside an office room, he shows Aldrin his "secret" footage, which Sibrel says was sent to him by mistake from NASA. According to Sibrel, this footage shows the crew rigging a shot inside their spacecraft to appear halfway to the Moon, when they were really in Earth orbit and trying to deceive the world.

Aldrin dismisses Sibrel's arguments, stating "We went to the Moon; we're not misleading anybody." Later in the video, Sibrel confronts Aldrin on another occasion, this time in September 2002 in Beverly Hills. The confrontational video maker makes his Bible demand. The astronaut refuses and tries his best to get away from Sibrel, who follows Aldrin and calls him "a coward, and a liar, and a thief." Aldrin then punches (visually described as a right overhand) Sibrel on camera. This incident, which made international headlines at the time, is the best-known response he received from one of the Apollo astronauts about his conspiracy belief. In a radio interview, Sibrel stated that he blames himself for provoking Aldrin to punch him. He claims to have sent Aldrin a letter of apology.

=== Other astronauts ===
As shown in the video, Sibrel also was able to interview astronauts Alan Bean, Eugene Cernan, and Edgar Mitchell about the Apollo project. Bean, for instance, states that the "all-up" testing of the Saturn V rocket cut months off the schedule and was an impetus to reach the Moon before decade's end. Cernan describes an experiment on his Moon mission, Apollo 17, that was specifically designed to study the radiation of the Van Allen radiation belts. The interviews end with the request to swear an oath on Sibrel's Bible. He asks them to "swear and affirm, under penalty of eternal damnation, perjury, and treason" that the astronauts really went to the Moon. Cernan and Mitchell testify that they did indeed walk on the Moon, taking the oath as Sibrel states it to them. Bean is also willing to swear on Sibrel's Bible, though Sibrel shows him as unwilling to swear under penalty of treason.

Later, Mitchell had the following to say about his encounter: "Sibrel faked his way into my home with false History Channel credentials for an interview. After about 3–4 minutes, he popped the bible question. Realizing who he was, I maintained my cool enough to swear on his bible, then ended the interview and tossed him out of the house, with a boot in his rear."

The other astronauts Sibrel confronts are Michael Collins, Alfred Worden, Bill Anders, John Young, and Neil Armstrong. Sibrel did not arrange formal interviews with any of them, instead accosting them at public events to make his Bible request. For the most part, these astronauts do the best they can to avoid him as soon as they find out that he supports the conspiracy theory. He confronts Armstrong at a meeting of stockholders in New York City. During interviews for the biography, regarding the hoax claims, Armstrong said, "It doesn't bother me. It will all pass in time." The Apollo 11 commander refused to go along with his demands and states, "Mr. Sibrel, you do not deserve answers." Meanwhile, Worden tells Sibrel that his claims of a falsified mission are "totally nonsense." He says that he has no problem swearing on the Bible of his trip to the Moon, but that he does not feel he needs to do so.

== See also ==
- Bill Kaysing
