= Capricorn One =

1977 thriller film by Peter Hyams

- Theatrical release poster
- Directed by: Peter Hyams
- Written by: Peter Hyams
- Produced by: Paul N. Lazarus III
- Starring: Elliott Gould; James Brolin; Brenda Vaccaro; Sam Waterston; O. J. Simpson; Hal Holbrook; David Huddleston; David Doyle; Karen Black; Telly Savalas
- Cinematography: Bill Butler
- Edited by: James Mitchell
- Music by: Jerry Goldsmith
- Production companies: ITC Entertainment; Associated General Films
- Distributed by: Warner Bros. Pictures (United States); ITC Film Distributors (United Kingdom)
- Release dates: December 10, 1977 (Japan); May 5, 1978 (United States); January 11, 1979 (United Kingdom)
- Running time: 129 minutes (Original) 123 minutes (Worldwide)
- Countries: United States; United Kingdom
- Language: English
- Budget: $5 million (estimated)
- Box office: $12 million (US and Canada rental)

Capricorn One is a 1977 thriller film in which a reporter discovers that a supposed Mars landing by a crewed mission to the planet has been faked via a conspiracy involving the government and—under duress—the crew themselves. It was written and directed by Peter Hyams and produced by Lew Grade's ITC Entertainment. It stars Elliott Gould as the reporter and James Brolin, Sam Waterston, and O. J. Simpson as the astronauts. Hal Holbrook plays a senior NASA official who goes along with governmental and corporate interests and helps to fake the mission. The music score was created by Jerry Goldsmith.

== Plot ==
Capricorn One—the first crewed mission to Mars—is on the launch pad. Just before liftoff, astronauts Charles Brubaker, Peter Willis, and John Walker are suddenly ordered out of the spacecraft by a NASA official. Bewildered, they are flown in secret to an abandoned military base in the desert. The launch proceeds on schedule, with the public unaware the spacecraft is empty.

At the base, NASA head Dr. James Kelloway informs the astronauts that a faulty life-support system would have killed them in-flight. He says they must help counterfeit the televised footage during the flight to and from Mars. Another failed space mission would result in NASA's funding being cut and private contractors losing billions in profits. Kelloway threatens their families to force their cooperation.

The astronauts are held captive during the spaceflight and appear to be filmed after landing on Mars, although they are actually inside an elaborate set at the base made to look like the surface of Mars. At the command center, only a few officials know about the conspiracy until an alert technician, Elliot Whitter, notices that ground control receives the crew's televised transmissions before the spacecraft telemetry arrives. Whitter reports this to his supervisors, including Kelloway, but is told it is due to a faulty workstation. Whitter partially shares his concerns with a TV journalist friend, Robert Caulfield. Whitter suddenly vanishes, and when Caulfield goes to Whitter's apartment the next day, he discovers someone else living there and that all evidence of Whitter's recent life has been erased. As Caulfield leaves, he survives a car crash into a river after his car had been tampered with.

Upon returning to Earth, the empty spacecraft burns up during atmospheric reentry due to a faulty heat shield, which would have killed the astronauts had they been on board. The astronauts realize officials will need to kill them to keep the hoax a secret. They escape in a small jet which quickly runs out of fuel, forcing a crash-landing in the desert. They split up on foot to increase their chances of finding help and exposing the plot. Kelloway sends helicopters after them. Willis and Walker are found and killed, while Brubaker evades capture.

Caulfield interviews Brubaker's "widow", Kay, after reviewing a televised conversation between the astronauts and their wives. Kay Brubaker had seemed confused when her husband mentioned their last family vacation. She explains that the family had actually gone to a different location, where a western movie was being filmed. Brubaker was intrigued by how special effects and technology made it seem real.

Caulfield believes Brubaker would never make such a mistake and may have been sending his wife a message. Caulfield goes to the deserted western movie set and is shot at. As he investigates further, federal agents break into his home, arresting him for possessing cocaine that they planted there. His exasperated boss bails Caulfield out, then fires him.

A reporter friend tells Caulfield about an abandoned military base located 300 miles (about 480 km) from Houston. The base is now deserted, but Caulfield finds a medallion belonging to Brubaker, confirming the astronauts were there. Caulfield hires a crop-dusting pilot named Albain to search the desert. They spot and follow two helicopters to a closed isolated gas station where Brubaker is hiding. They rescue him as he attempts to escape his pursuers. The helicopters chase their plane through a canyon but crash when Albain blinds them with crop spray, allowing the plane to get away.

Caulfield and Brubaker arrive halfway through a memorial service being held for the three astronauts, where they are seen by Kelloway, Kay Brubaker, all assembled service attendees, and the television cameras that were present and covering the service for live broadcast.

== Cast ==
- Elliott Gould as Robert Caulfield
- James Brolin as Charles Brubaker
- Brenda Vaccaro as Kay Brubaker
- Sam Waterston as Peter Willis
- O. J. Simpson as John Walker
- Hal Holbrook as Dr. James Kelloway
- Karen Black as Judy Drinkwater
- Telly Savalas as Albain
- David Huddleston as Hollis Peaker
- David Doyle as Walter Loughlin
- Lee Bryant as Sharon Willis
- Denise Nicholas as Betty Walker
- Robert Walden as Elliot Whitter
- Alan Fudge as Capsule Communicator
- James Karen as Vice President Price
- Norman Bartold as President
- Darrell Zwerling as Dr. Bergen
- Milton Selzer as Dr. Roger Burroughs
- James B. Sikking as Control Room Man (smoking a pipe)
- Lou Frizzell as Horace Gruning
- Paul Picerni as Jerry
- Barbara Bosson as Alva Leacock

== Production ==
=== Development ===
Peter Hyams began thinking about a film of a space hoax while working on broadcasts of the Apollo program missions for CBS. He later reflected regarding the Apollo 11 Moon landing, "There was one event of really enormous importance that had almost no witnesses. And the only verification we have ... came from a TV camera."

He later elaborated, in a 2014 interview with UK film magazine Empire:

Whenever there was something on the news about a [space flight], they would cut to a studio in St. Louis where there was a simulation of what was going on. I grew up in the generation where my parents basically believed if it was in the newspaper it was true. That turned out to be bullshit. My generation was brought up to believe television was true, and that was bullshit too. So I was watching these simulations and I wondered what would happen if someone faked a whole story.

Hyams wrote the script in 1972 but no one wanted to make it. He says interest in the script was re-activated by the Watergate Scandal. He approached producer Paul Lazarus. Hyams and Lazarus had a meeting with Lew Grade, head of production company ITC Entertainment who had recently moved into film production with The Return of the Pink Panther. Grade agreed to make the film after only five minutes. The budget was $4.8 million (equivalent to about $37 million today).

Grade announced the film in October 1975 as a part of a slate of ten films he intended to make over the next 12 months, including The Domino Principle, Action - Clear the Fast Lanes and Juarez. The last two were ultimately not made.

Despite the film's portrayal of NASA as orchestrating a fraudulent Mars landing and conspiring to murder its astronauts, the agency cooperated with the production, and its name and insignia appear prominently throughout the film. Producer Paul Lazarus had established a relationship with NASA while making Futureworld, enabling the filmmakers to obtain government equipment as props, including a prototype Apollo Lunar Module. Lazarus later expressed surprise at the agency's cooperation, recounting that his NASA contact had approved the assistance without referring the script to officials in Washington, where it likely would have been rejected.

In September 1976, it was announced the cast would include Elliott Gould, O. J. Simpson, James Brolin, Brenda Vaccaro, and Candice Bergen. The presence of Brolin and Simpson in the cast helped secure a presale to NBC. Ultimately Bergen pulled out and was replaced by Karen Black.

=== Shooting ===
Filming started in January 1977. Shooting locations included Cinema Center Films in Studio City, and Red Rock Canyon State Park.

Hyams later joked, "O. J. Simpson was in it, and Robert Blake was in Busting [Hyams' first feature]. I've said many times: Some people have AFI Lifetime Achievement awards; some people have multiple Oscars; my bit of trivia is that I've made films with two leading men who were subsequently tried for the first-degree murder[s] of their wives."

== Release ==
The film originally was scheduled to debut in the United States in February 1978, but good preview screenings and delays in Superman caused it to move to May. Capricorn One became the year's most-successful independent film.

Hyams later said:

Audiences just stood up and cheered at one point in the film. It wasn't because it was such a great movie, it's just that certain movies strike certain chords with people. In a successful movie, the audience, almost before they see it, know they're going to like it. I remember standing in the back of the theater and crying because I knew that something had changed in my life. Sitting on the film cans outside the screening room, I felt my cheeks were wet with tears. A bright man, [studio executive] David Picker came over to me and said, 'You're going to have a lot of new best friends tomorrow. You better know how to handle it.'

In Japan and the UK, a version with a running time of 129 minutes was released theatrically, with additional scenes such as the docking of the spacecraft during the Mars landing, and with different cuts of detail. However, the rights company (ITC Entertainment) has since taken the position that the final version of Capricorn One is the 123-minute version currently in circulation, and that the 129-minute version no longer exists. Therefore, only the 123-minute version is currently distributed in Japan and the UK. However, in 2019, film material from the 129-minute version was discovered at the National Film Archive of Japan, so remastered material was created based on this film and released as "bonus content" only on Japanese Blu-ray, after obtaining permission from the rights company.

== Reception ==
Vincent Canby of The New York Times called the film "an expensive, stylistically bankrupt suspense melodrama" while describing much of its screenplay as "humorless comic-strip stuff." Conversely, Gene Siskel of the Chicago Tribune gave the film three-and-a-half stars out of four and called it "a surprisingly good thriller" with a runaway car sequence "that provides some of the best action footage I've seen in a long time." Variety faulted the film's "underdeveloped script" and "scattershot casting", calling the duo of Savalas and Gould "a bullseye" but Waterston and Simpson lacking in "group chemistry".

Kevin Thomas of the Los Angeles Times thought the beginning of the film was the best part, and what follows "is wildly uneven, veering between the serious and the merely silly, and ending up likely to please only the least demanding." Gary Arnold of The Washington Post wrote, "Capricorn One harks back to the old adventure serials, but Hyams doesn't have remotely enough wit or technique to achieve a fresh stylization of vintage formulas."

Richard Combs of The Monthly Film Bulletin stated "Somewhere within this flabby, overproduced fantasy about space-age double-dealing and Watergate-type sleuthing lives a smaller, tighter film—and a much wittier satire on the space program and technologies, like Hollywood, designed to deceive and manipulate. The trouble is that this more ideal version is not really struggling to get out but wallowing complacently in the limitless excess that has become the Lew Grade trademark."

In a retrospective review, AllMovie critic Donald Guarisco wrote: "This agreeable high-concept effort is one of Peter Hyams' most accomplished films. The script's conspiracy-theory premise requires a major suspension of disbelief, but Hyams makes it worthwhile for those willing to make that leap."

Capricorn One holds a 61% approval rating on Rotten Tomatoes based on 23 reviews. The site's consensus states: "A string of questionable plot contrivances threaten to bury its story, but Capricorn One manages to unfurl an amusing, sharply cynical conspiracy yarn." Metacritic, which uses a weighted average, assigned the film a score of 38 out of 100, based on 8 critics, indicating "generally unfavorable" reviews.

== Other media ==
UK version, by Ken Follett (as Bernard L. Ross)

US novelization of Capricorn One, by Ron Goulart

Two novelizations of the film were written and published by separate authors. The first was written by Ken Follett (under the pseudonym Bernard L. Ross) and published in the United Kingdom; the other was written by Ron Goulart and published in the United States.

The Follett novel is notable for giving Robert Caulfield more development than the movie does, including giving him something of a relationship with CBS reporter Judy Drinkwater (who has more time in the book than in the movie) and ending the book with him and Judy. The story saves his career and results in his being employed by CBS. The faked Mars landing scene is also different. In the film, astronauts Peter Willis and John Walker serve as CM Pilot and LM Pilot respectively, Follett swaps these roles in his novelisation. And although explicitly stated in the film that conversation to and from Mars would take twenty-one minutes, such that the astronauts couldn't communicate with their wives until the final leg of the return voyage back to Earth, Follett streamlines these two scenes into one by having the astronauts communicate with their wives during the faked Mars EVA.

Clips from the faked Mars landing scenes have been used for illustration purposes in various Moon landing hoax conspiracy documentaries, notably the Fox TV show Conspiracy Theory: Did We Land on the Moon and Bart Sibrel's film A Funny Thing Happened on the Way to the Moon (2001). The latter also features a still shot from the hoax scene on the DVD's front cover.

In 2020–2021, Capricorn One was used as part of an internet prank. A viral video purported to be released by WikiLeaks was uploaded to BitChute, Twitter, Facebook and other social media platforms and blogs with a title: "Wikileaks releases – Moon landing cut scene – filmed in Nevada desert". In fact, WikiLeaks released no such video. Close inspection revealed this prank video to be made using clips from Capricorn One and even various film reels shot on the set of Capricorn One, which were then cut and spliced with stock footage from the Apollo missions and training sessions.

== See also ==
- Moon landing conspiracy theories
- Diamonds Are Forever (film) – "Moon buggy" scene

== Sources ==
- Bancroft, Colette (September 29, 2002). "Lunar lunacy". St. Petersburg Times. Archived from the original on June 28, 2011.
- Szebin, Frederick C. (April 20, 2000). "The Making of Capricorn One". Mania. Archived from the original on March 2, 2009.
- Allison, Deborah (May 2007). "Film/Print: Novelisations and Capricorn One". M/C Journal. 10 (2). doi:10.5204/mcj.2633.
