= Edgar Mitchell =

American astronaut and lunar explorer (1930–2016)

Ed Mitchell
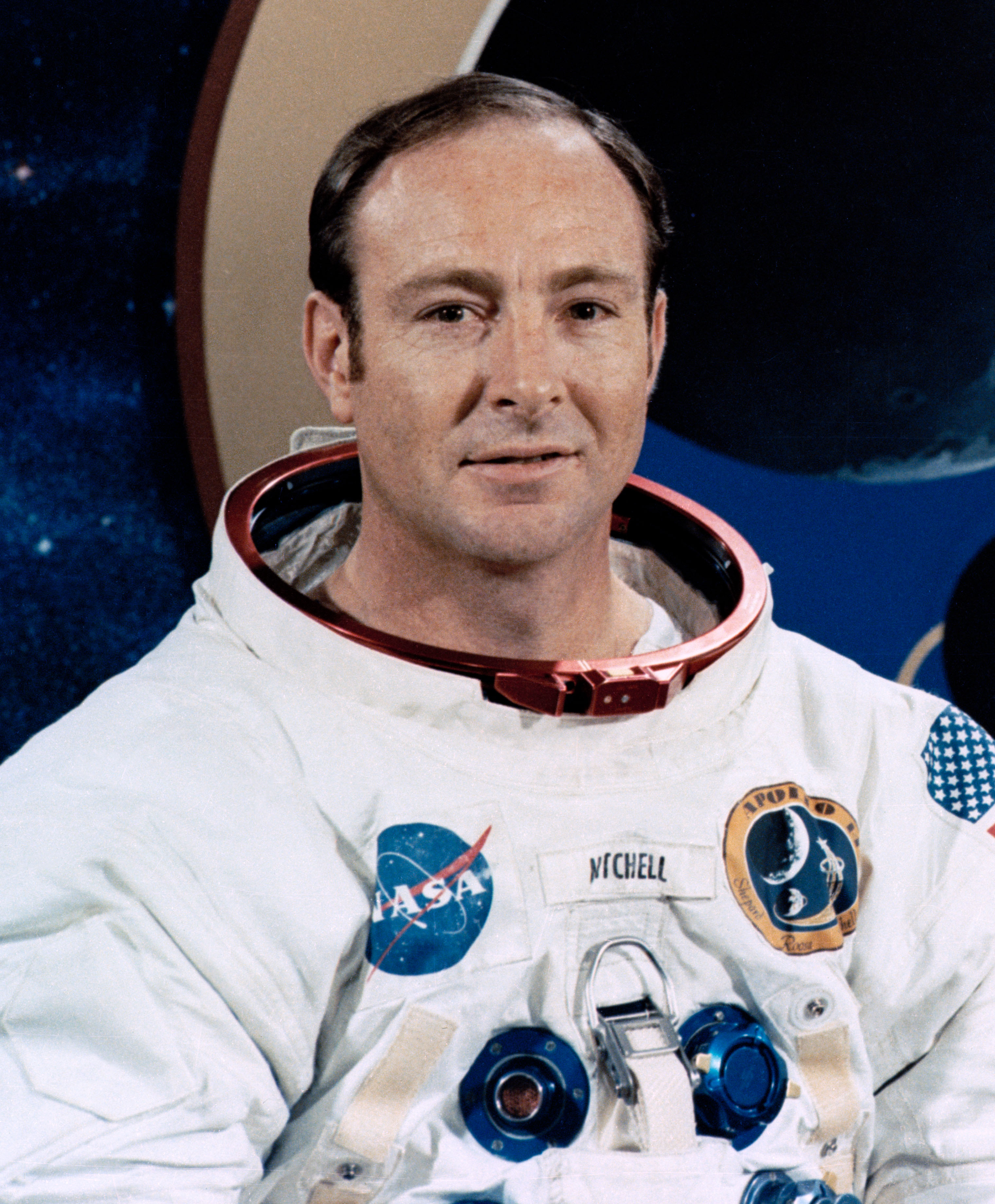
- Mitchell in 1971 during the Apollo 14 mission
- Born: Edgar Dean Mitchell; September 17, 1930; Hereford, Texas, U.S.
- Died: February 4, 2016 (aged 85); West Palm Beach, Florida, U.S.
- Education: Carnegie Mellon University (BS); Naval Postgraduate School (BS); Massachusetts Institute of Technology (ScD)
- Spouse(s): Louise Randall (m. 1951; div. 1972) Anita Rettig (m. 1973; div. 1984) Sheila Sisco (m. 1989; div. 1999)
- Children: 6
- Awards: Presidential Medal of Freedom; NASA Distinguished Service Medal
- Space career

NASA astronaut
- Rank: Captain, U.S. Navy
- Time in space: 9 days, 1 minute
- Selection: NASA Group 5 (1966)
- Total EVAs: 2
- Total EVA time: 9 hours, 23 minutes
- Mission: Apollo 14
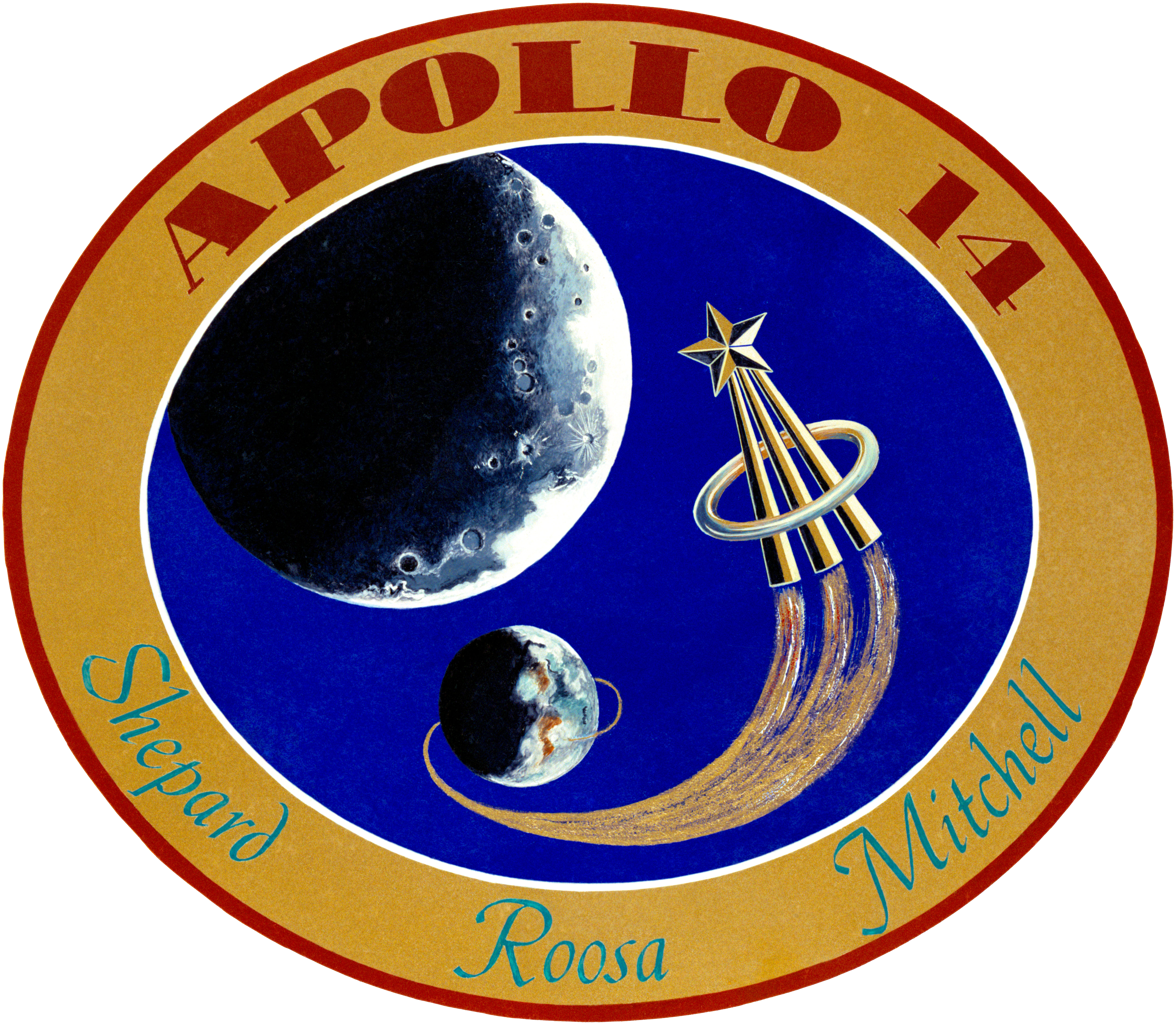
- Mission insignia
- Retired: October 1, 1972

Signature
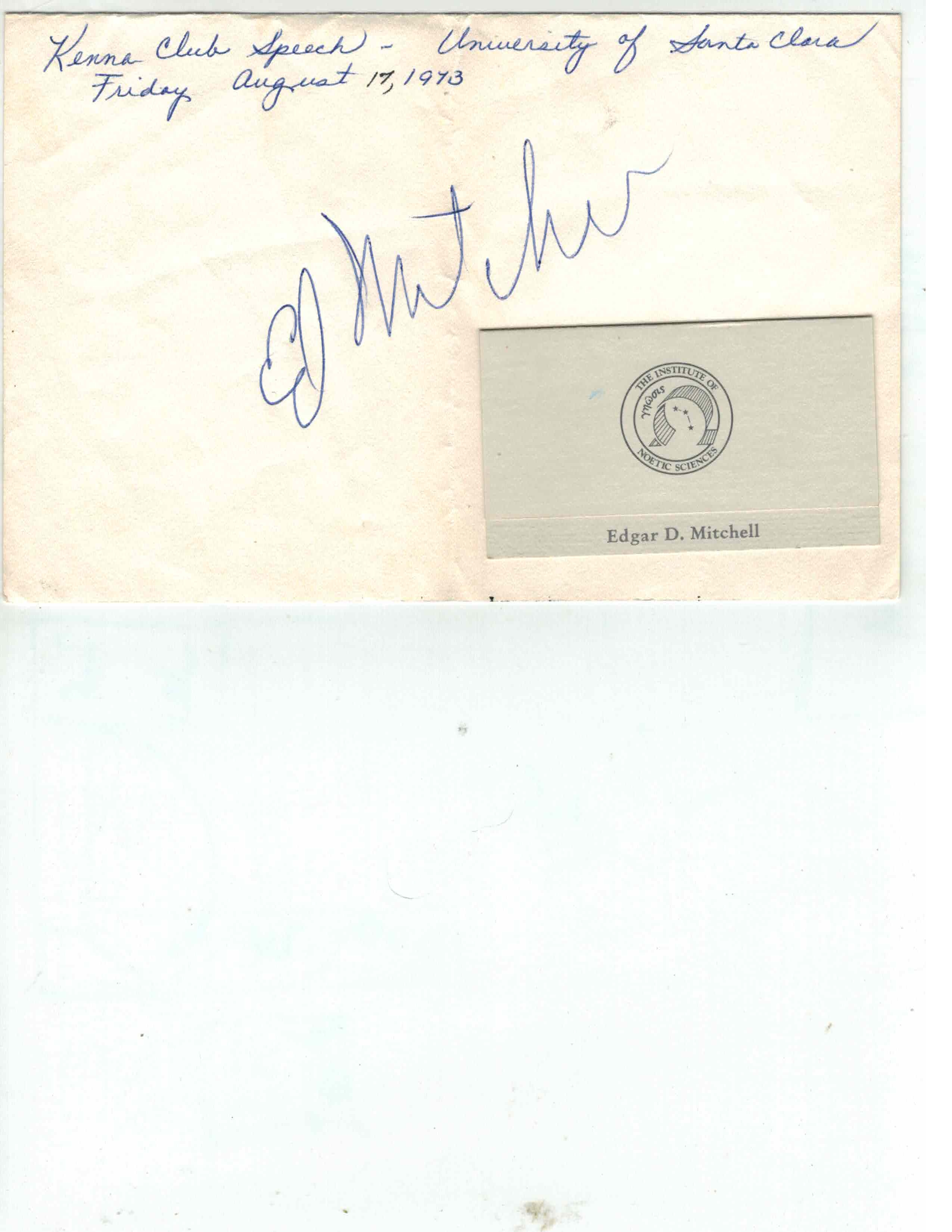

Notes
- Autograph of Edgar D. Mitchell with Noetic Sciences business card

Edgar Dean Mitchell (September 17, 1930 – February 4, 2016) was a United States Navy officer and aviator, test pilot, aeronautical engineer, ufologist, and NASA astronaut. As the Lunar Module Pilot of Apollo 14 in 1971 he spent nine hours working on the lunar surface in the Fra Mauro Highlands region, and was the sixth person to walk on the Moon.

Before becoming an astronaut, Mitchell earned his Bachelor of Science degree in Industrial Management from Carnegie Institute of Technology and entered the United States Navy in 1952. After being commissioned through the Officer Candidate School at Newport, Rhode Island, he served as a Naval Aviator. In 1961, he received his second bachelor's degree, in aeronautical engineering, from the U.S. Naval Postgraduate School and three years later earned his doctorate in Aeronautics and Astronautics from the Massachusetts Institute of Technology (MIT). From 1965 to 1966, he attended the U.S. Air Force Aerospace Research Pilot School and graduated first in his class. During this period, he served as an instructor in advanced mathematics and navigation theory for astronaut candidates.

The legacy of his post-NASA scientific and parapsychology work is carried on through the Institute of Noetic Sciences.

== Early life and education ==
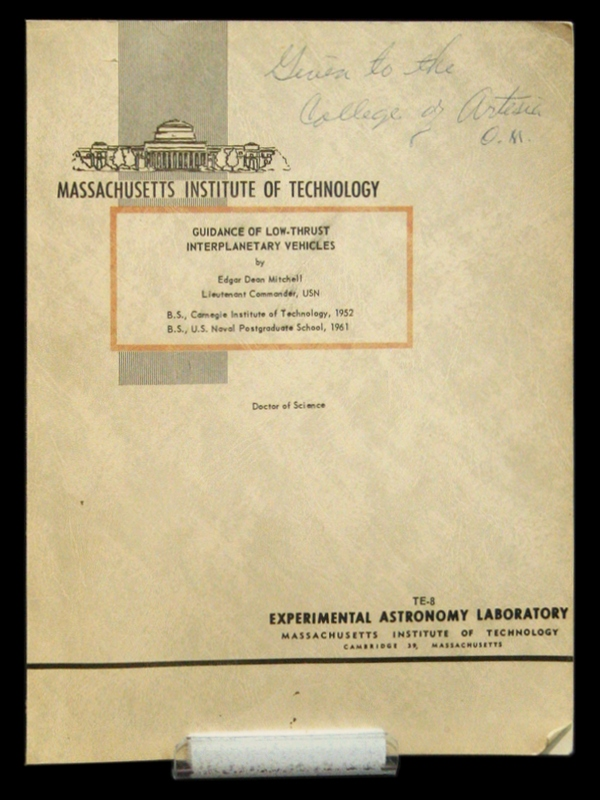
Mitchell's doctoral thesis on space vehicle guidance on display at the United States Astronaut Hall of Fame

Mitchell was born on September 17, 1930, in Hereford, Texas, to Joseph Thomas Mitchell and Ollidean Margaret Mitchell (née Arnold). He had three siblings: Joyce Alyene, who died in her infancy in 1933, Sandra Jo, and Jay Neely "Coach", who was a member of the inaugural graduating class of the United States Air Force Academy in 1959, and a pilot with the United States Air Force (USAF), achieving the rank of colonel. He came from a ranching family that moved to New Mexico during the Depression and considered Artesia, New Mexico (near Roswell) as his hometown. He first learned to fly at 13, receiving his private pilot license at 16, and was active in the Boy Scouts of America where he achieved its second highest rank, Life Scout. He was also a member of DeMolay International, part of the Masonic Fraternity, and was inducted into its Hall of Fame. Mitchell was a member of Artesia Lodge #29 in New Mexico. He enjoyed handball, tennis, and swimming, and his hobbies included scuba diving and soaring.

He graduated from Artesia High School in 1948. Mitchell received a Bachelor of Science degree in industrial management from the Carnegie Institute of Technology (now Carnegie Mellon University) in 1952, where he was a member of Kappa Sigma fraternity. That same year, he entered the United States Navy and completed basic training at San Diego Recruit Depot. While on active duty in the Navy, he earned a second bachelor's degree, in aeronautical engineering, from the U.S. Naval Postgraduate School in 1961 and a Doctor of Science degree in aeronautics and astronautics from the Massachusetts Institute of Technology (MIT) in 1964.

== Flight experience ==
In May 1953, after completing instruction at the Officer Candidate School at Newport, Rhode Island, Mitchell was commissioned an ensign. He completed flight training in July 1954 at Hutchinson, Kansas, was designated as a Naval Aviator and received the Daughters of the American Revolution Award for achieving the highest overall marks during flight training. After period of instruction from July to September 1954 at the Fleet Airborne Electronics Training Unit, U.S. Pacific Fleet, Mitchell was subsequently assigned to Patrol Squadron 29 (VP-29), flying land-based patrol planes, deployed to Okinawa.

From 1957 to 1958, Mitchell transitioned to carrier-based jet aircraft and flew the A3D Skywarrior while assigned to Heavy Attack Squadron Two (VAH-2) deployed aboard the aircraft carriers USS Bon Homme Richard and USS Ticonderoga. He qualified as a research pilot and flew with Air Development Squadron Five until 1959. Following the completion of his graduate studies, Mitchell served as Chief, Project Management Division of the Navy Field Office for the Manned Orbiting Laboratory from 1964 to 1965. From 1965 to 1966, he attended the U.S. Air Force Aerospace Research Pilot School (Class 65B) for certification as a test pilot, graduating first in his class. During this period, Mitchell served as an instructor in advanced mathematics and navigation theory for astronaut candidates.

Mitchell accumulated 5,000 hours flight time, including 2,000 hours in jet aircraft.

== NASA career ==
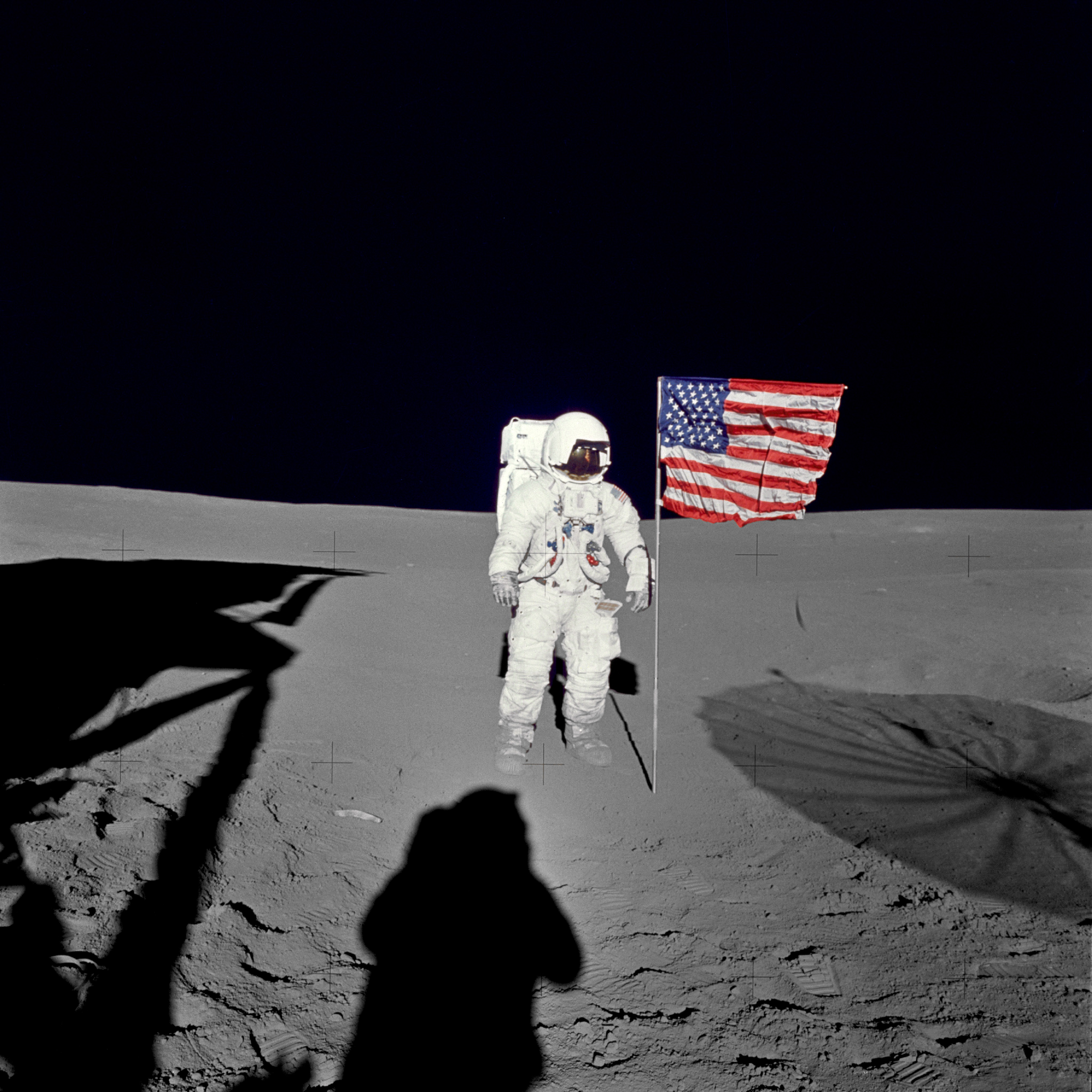
Mitchell stands with the United States' flag on the Moon, 1971

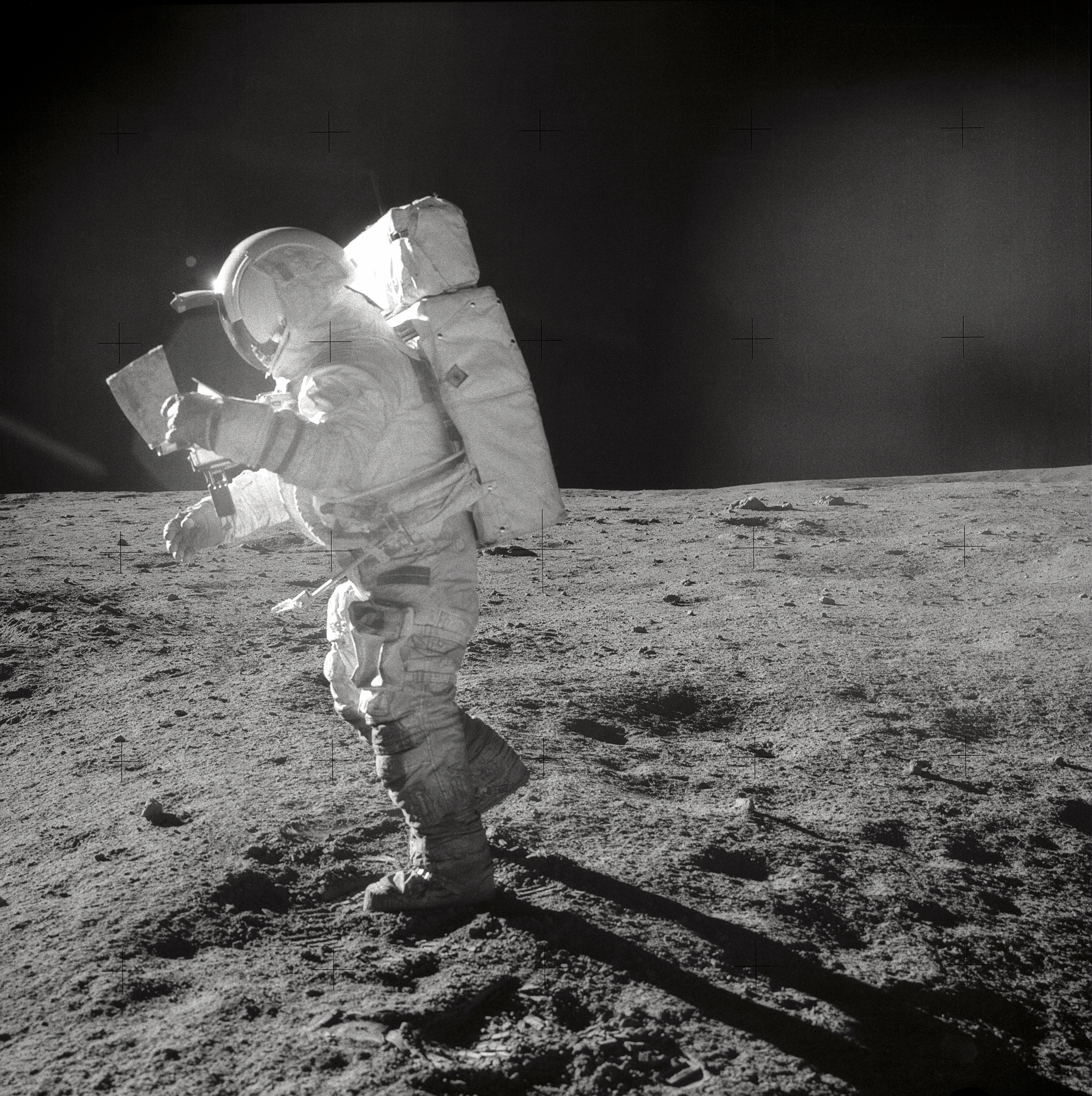
Mitchell studies a map while walking on the Moon, February 6, 1971

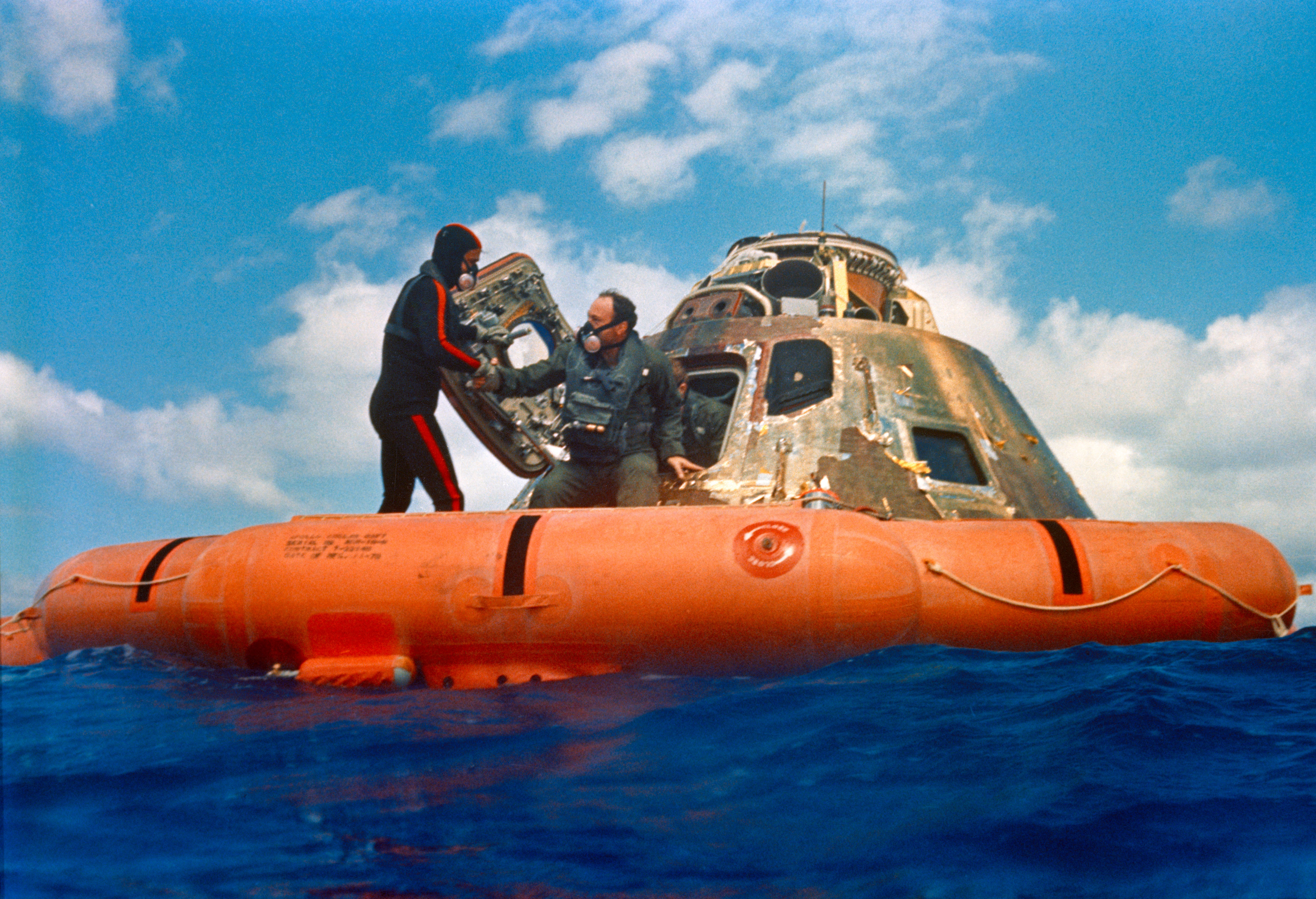
A U.S. Navy diver helps Mitchell out of the Command Module, 1971

Mitchell was selected in 1966 as part of NASA's fifth astronaut group. He was assigned to the support crew for Apollo 9, then was designated as backup Lunar Module Pilot for Apollo 10. This placed him in rotation for Apollo 13, but his crew was switched to Apollo 14 so that Commander Alan Shepard, who had been grounded by a medical problem since the Gemini program, could train longer.

During the Apollo 13 crisis, Mitchell was a part of the Apollo 13 Mission Operations Team and as such was awarded the Presidential Medal of Freedom by President Richard M. Nixon in 1970. He worked in an Apollo simulator to help bring the crew back. One issue he worked on was how to "fly" (meaning control the attitude of) the Lunar Module with an inert Apollo Command/Service Module attached to it. (Usually, it was the other way around, but the Service Module was damaged during that mission.)

He then went to serve as Lunar Module Pilot on Apollo 14, landing with Shepard aboard the Lunar Module Antares on February 5, 1971, in the hilly upland Fra Mauro Highlands region of the Moon. They stayed on the Moon for 33 hours, deployed and activated lunar surface scientific equipment and experiments, and collected almost 100 pounds of lunar samples for return to Earth. Other Apollo 14 achievements include: only use of the Mobile Equipment Transporter (MET); first successful use of color television with a new Vidicon tube; longest distance traversed on foot on the lunar surface; largest payload placed in lunar orbit; first use of shortened lunar orbit rendezvous techniques; and first extensive orbital science period conducted during CSM solo operations.

In completing his first space flight, Mitchell logged a total of 216 hours and 42 minutes in space. He was subsequently designated to serve as backup Lunar Module Pilot for Apollo 16.

During the mission, he took photos, including the one with Shepard raising the American flag. In the photo, Mitchell's shadow is cast over the lunar surface near the flag. That photo was listed on Popular Science's photo gallery of the best astronaut selfies.

You develop an instant global consciousness, a people orientation, an intense dissatisfaction with the state of the world, and a compulsion to do something about it. From out there on the moon, international politics look so petty. You want to grab a politician by the scruff of the neck and drag him a quarter of a million miles out and say, "Look at that, you son of a bitch."

— Mitchell on the overview effect after seeing the Earth from the Moon.

== Post-NASA career ==
Mitchell's interests included consciousness and paranormal phenomena. On his way back to Earth during the Apollo 14 flight he had a powerful savikalpa samādhi experience, and he claimed to have conducted private ESP experiments with his friends on Earth. The results of these experiments were published in the Journal of Parapsychology in 1971.

He retired from NASA and the U.S. Navy with the rank of captain in October 1972. Immediately thereafter, he founded Edgar D. Mitchell & Associates of Monterey, California, a "commercial organization promoting ecologically-pure products and services designed to alleviate planetary problems."

After moving to Atherton, California, he became founding chairman of the Institute of Noetic Sciences (IONS) in Palo Alto, California in 1973 for the purpose of consciousness research and other "related phenomena". "Science and religion have lived on opposite sides of the street now for hundreds of years," Mitchell said toward the end of his life. "So here we are, in the twenty-first century, trying to put two faces of reality—the existence face and the intelligence or conscious face—into the same understanding. Body and mind, physicality and consciousness belong to the same side of reality.

Journalist Annie Jacobsen has asserted that Mitchell's Mind Science Institute (a Los Angeles, California-based organization ultimately subsumed by the Institute of Noetic Sciences) was employed by the Central Intelligence Agency (CIA) as a surreptitious conduit for payments to Andrija Puharich and Uri Geller while the latter was evaluated by an SRI International research group (led by Harold E. Puthoff and Russell Targ) in 1972. In 1976, Mitchell attempted to secure additional funding for the SRI group's remote viewing research in a private meeting with then-Director of Central Intelligence George H. W. Bush, who knew Mitchell socially. Although Bush demurred (citing post-Watergate investigations of the intelligence community), he suggested the pursuit of military sponsorship, leading to the formation of the Stargate Project in 1978.

From 1974 to 1978, he was president of the Palm Beach, Florida-based Edgar Mitchell Corporation. In 1975, he moved to nearby Lantana, Florida, where he resided for the rest of his life. He co-founded the Association of Space Explorers in 1983 and later served as chairman of the Mitchell Communications Company.

Mitchell's heretofore undisclosed experimentation with LSD was reported by writer David Jay Brown in The New Science of Psychedelics: At the Nexus of Culture, Consciousness, and Spirituality (2013). Although he favorably compared the sensations of the psychedelic experience to his time in zero gravity, it remains unclear if his use preceded or followed Apollo 14.

In 1997, Mitchell was interviewed for NASA's oral history program. In one excerpt from that, he talked about how he was drawn to the space program:

After Kennedy announced the moon program, that's what I wanted, because it was the bear going over the mountain to see what he could see, and what could you learn, and I've been devoted to that, to exploration, education, and discovery since my earliest years, and that's what kept me going.

— Edgar Mitchell

On June 29, 2011, the federal government of the United States filed a lawsuit against Mitchell in the United States district court in Miami, Florida after discovering that he placed a camera used on Apollo 14 for auction at the auction house Bonhams. The litigation requested the camera be returned to NASA. Mitchell's position was that NASA had given him the camera as a gift upon the completion of the Apollo 14 mission. Bonhams withdrew the camera from auction. In October 2011, attorneys representing the government and Mitchell reached a settlement agreement, and Mitchell agreed to return the camera to NASA, which in turn would donate it for display at the National Air and Space Museum. On September 20, 2012, Congress enacted H.R. 4158, confirming full ownership rights of artifacts to astronauts on Apollo (and Mercury and Gemini) space missions.

=== Remote healing ===
Mitchell claimed that a teenage remote healer living in Vancouver and using the pseudonym "Adam Dreamhealer" helped him heal kidney cancer from a distance. Mitchell said that while he never had a biopsy, "I had a sonogram and MRI that was consistent with renal carcinoma." Adam worked (distantly) on Mitchell from December 2003 until June 2004, when the "irregularity was gone and we haven't seen it since".

=== Views on UFOs ===
Mitchell publicly expressed his opinions that he was "90 percent sure that many of the thousands of unidentified flying objects, or UFOs, recorded since the 1940s, belong to visitors from other planets". Dateline NBC conducted an interview with Mitchell on April 19, 1996, during which he discussed meeting with officials from three countries who claimed to have had personal encounters with extraterrestrials. He offered his opinion that the evidence for such "alien" contact was "very strong" and "classified" by governments, who were covering up visitations and the existence of alien beings' bodies in places such as Roswell, New Mexico. He further claimed that UFOs had provided "sonic engineering secrets" that were helpful to the U.S. government. Mitchell's 1996 book, The Way of the Explorer, discusses his journey into mysticism and space.

In 2004, he told the St. Petersburg Times that a "cabal of insiders" in the U.S. government were studying recovered alien bodies, and that this group had stopped briefing U.S. Presidents after John F. Kennedy. He said, "We all know that UFOs are real; now the question is where they come from."

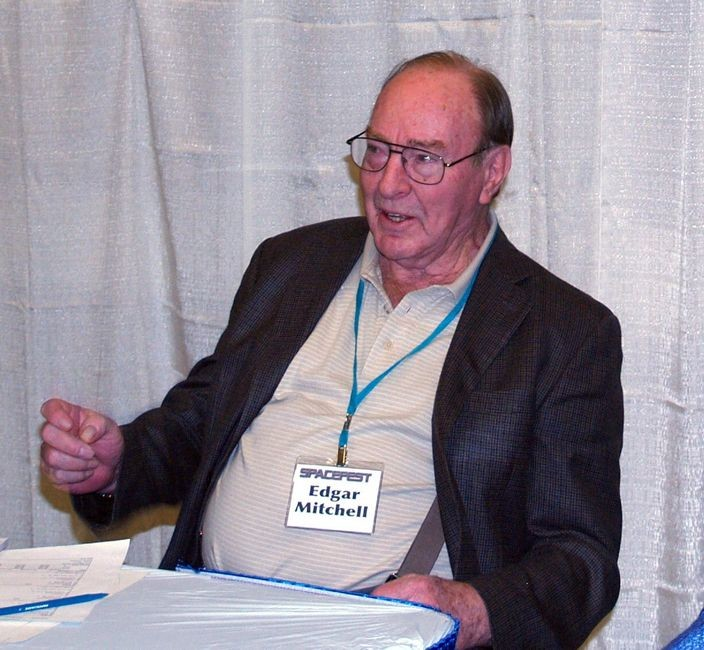
Edgar Mitchell, February 2009

On July 23, 2008, Edgar Mitchell was interviewed on Kerrang Radio by Nick Margerrison. Mitchell claimed the Roswell crash was real and that aliens have contacted humans several times, but that governments have hidden the truth for 60 years, stating: "I happen to have been privileged enough to be in on the fact that we've been visited on this planet, and the UFO phenomenon is real." In reply, a spokesman for NASA stated on the Skeptoid Podcast with Brian Dunning: "NASA does not track UFOs. NASA is not involved in any sort of cover-up about alien life on this planet or anywhere in the universe. Dr Mitchell is a great American, but we do not share his opinions on this issue."

In an interview with Fox News on July 25, 2008, Mitchell clarified that his comments did not involve NASA, but quoted unnamed sources, since deceased, at Roswell who confided to him that the Roswell incident did involve an alien craft. Mitchell also claims to have subsequently received confirmation from an unnamed intelligence officer at the Pentagon.

In an interview for AskMen published March 6, 2014, Mitchell said that he had never seen a UFO, that no one had ever threatened him over his claims regarding UFOs, and that any statements about the covering up of UFOs being a worldwide cabal was "just speculation on my part".

In 2015, Mitchell said in an interview with the Daily Mirror that extraterrestrials "had been attempting to keep us from going to war [with Russia] and help create peace on Earth." He also said that "White Sands was a testing ground for atomic weapons—and that's what the extraterrestrials were interested in. They wanted to know about our military capabilities."

=== Other projects ===
Edgar Mitchell appeared in the documentaries In the Shadow of the Moon (2007), The Phoenix Lights...We Are Not Alone, and The Living Matrix (2009).

Mitchell wrote several articles and essays as well as several books. In The Way of the Explorer, Mitchell proposed a dyadic model of reality.

He was the Advisory Board Chairman of the Institute for Cooperation in Space, co-founded by Carol Rosin, and a member of INREES.

Mitchell was one of the initial supporters of the Campaign for the Establishment of a United Nations Parliamentary Assembly, which would be a first step towards a "world parliament".

== Personal life ==
He was married to Louise Randall from 1951 to 1972. Following their divorce, he married Anita Rettig in 1973. The couple divorced in 1984 when he began an affair with former Playboy model Sheilah Ann Ledbetter. He was father to two children with Randall, adopted Rettig's three children, and later was father to another child, this time with Ledbetter, and ordered to pay child support. Ledbetter and Mitchell married in 1989 and divorced in 1999. He was survived by five children, nine grandchildren and one great-grandchild.

Anita Rettig served as chair of the Palm Beach County Republican Party, while Kimberly Mitchell (the eldest daughter from his union with Rettig) was a city commissioner in West Palm Beach, Florida.

== Death ==
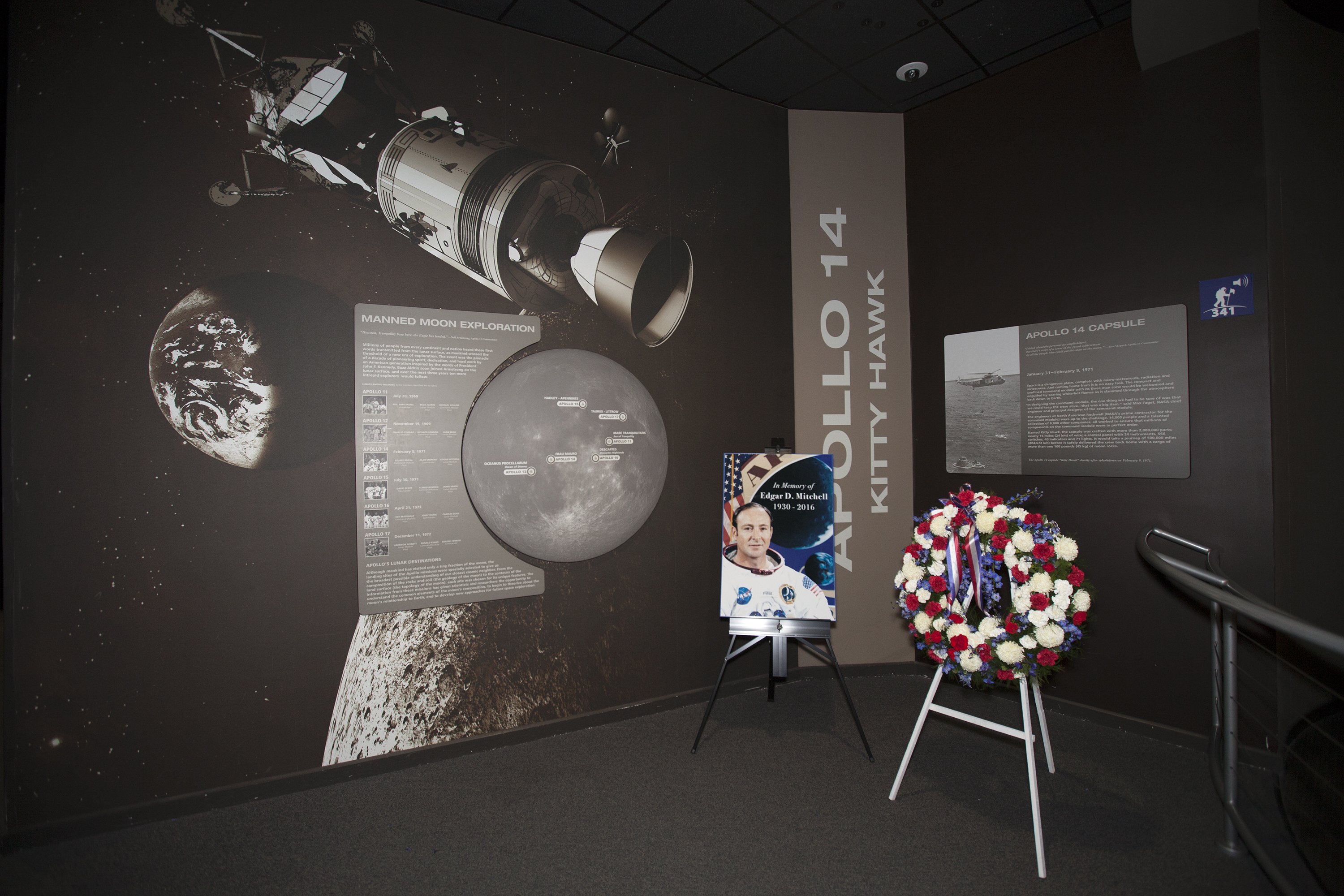
Edgar Mitchell's memorial in the Treasures of Apollo exhibit at Kennedy Space Center

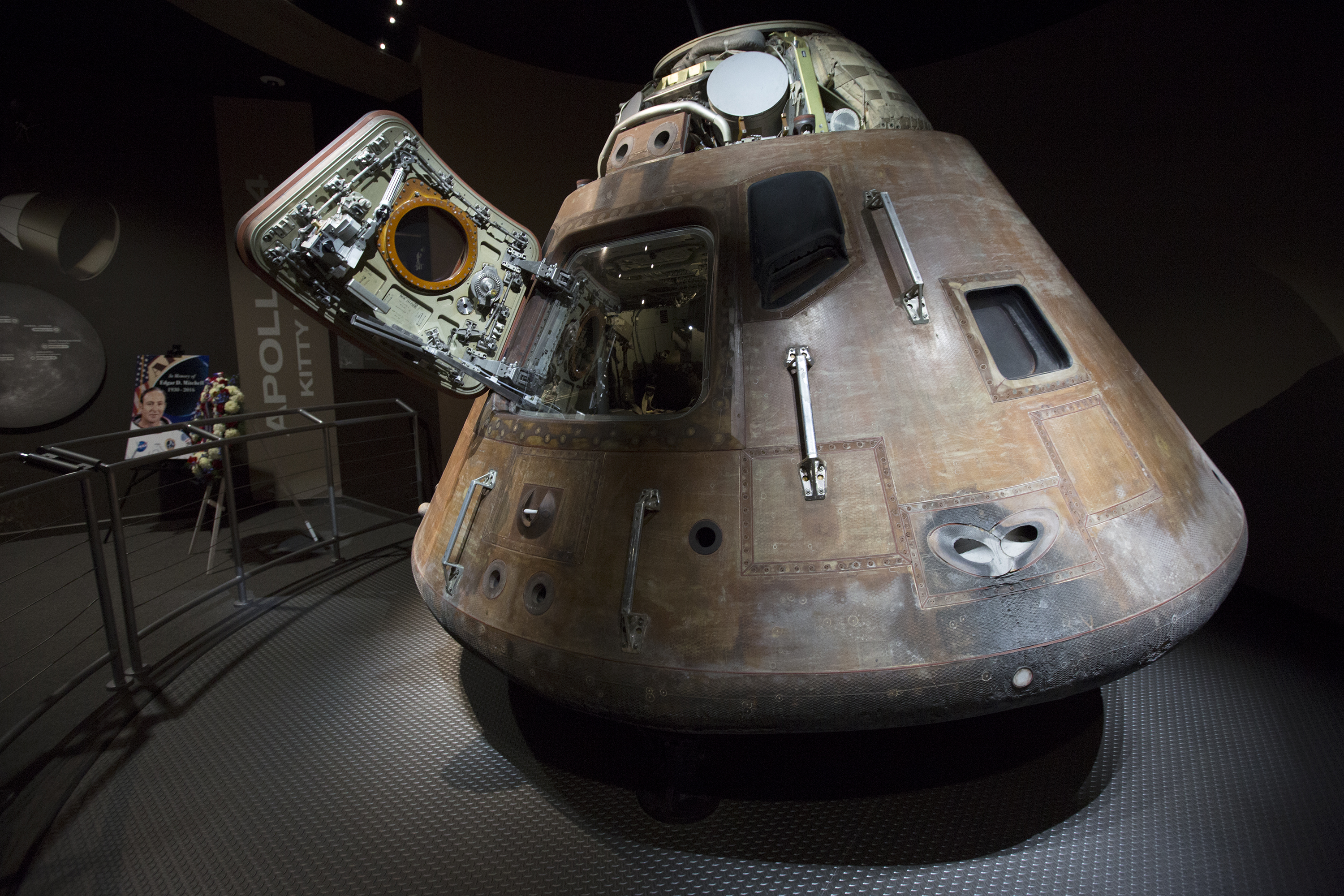
Apollo 14 command module Kitty Hawk, Mitchell's memorial wreath nearby

Mitchell died under hospice care in West Palm Beach, Florida, at the age of 85, on February 4, 2016, the eve of the 45th anniversary of his lunar landing. As Roosa and Shepard had died in the 1990s, Mitchell was the last surviving member of the Apollo 14 crew.

== Organizations ==
Mitchell was a member of the American Institute of Aeronautics and Astronautics; the Society of Experimental Test Pilots; Sigma Xi; Sigma Gamma Tau, New York Academy of Sciences; The Explorers Club; World Futures Society; International Platform Association; and he was also an honorary member of the Radio and Television Correspondents' Association.

== Awards and honors ==
- Presidential Medal of Freedom (1970)
- Manned Spacecraft Center Superior Achievement Award (1970)
- City of New York Gold Medal (1971)
- Arnold Air Society's John F. Kennedy Award (1971)
- Navy Astronaut Wings
- Navy Distinguished Service Medal
- NASA Distinguished Service Medal
- Air Medal
- National Defense Service Medal with bronze star
- China Service Medal
- three NASA Group Achievement Awards
- Inducted into the International Space Hall of Fame (inducted 1979)
- Along with 24 other Apollo astronauts, inducted into the United States Astronaut Hall of Fame on October 4, 1997.

Mitchell's other awards included:

- Honorary Doctorates from:
  - New Mexico State University (1971)
  - Carnegie-Mellon University (1971)
  - University of Akron (1979)
  - Embry-Riddle University (1996)
- American Astronautical Society's Flight Achievement Award
- Carnegie Mellon University Alumni, Outstanding Man of the Year (1972)
- Kappa Sigma, Man of the Year Award (1972)
- Adventurers Club, Gold Medal Award for Exploration
- Drexel University, Engineering and Science Award for Explorations in Consciousness (1974)
- The Explorers Club, Lowell Thomas Award for Explorations in Human Consciousness (1980)

== In media ==
In the 1998 HBO miniseries From the Earth to the Moon, Mitchell was played by Gary Cole.

He was the subject of a chapter of Chris Wright's book No More Worlds to Conquer, which asks how people who are famed for one moment moved on with their life. In it he talked at length about his beliefs in extraterrestrial visitation, the power of the mind, and his certainty that his cancer had been cured "by mind means".

The climactic scene of the 2004 documentary Astronauts Gone Wild features an interview with Mitchell. After filmmaker Bart Sibrel questions Mitchell about various aspects of footage from the Apollo 11 mission, Mitchell and his son threaten to murder Sibrel and his assistant.

== Books ==
- Psychic Exploration: A Challenge for Science (1974), G. Putnam & Sons, ISBN 0-399-11342-8
- The Way of the Explorer: An Apollo Astronaut's Journey Through the Material and Mystical Worlds (1996), G. Putnam & Sons, hardcover, ISBN 0-399-14161-8, 2008 paperback edition: ISBN 1-56414-977-3, audio cassette edition: ISBN 1-57270-019-X
- Earthrise: My Adventures as an Apollo 14 Astronaut (2014), Chicago Review Press, hardcover, ISBN 1-61374-901-5

== See also ==
- List of spaceflight records
- List of Apollo astronauts
- The Astronaut Monument
