= A Funny Thing Happened on the Way to the Moon =

2001 conspiracy theory film by Bart Sibrel

- DVD cover depicting a still shot from Capricorn One
- Directed by: Bart Sibrel
- Written by: Bart Sibrel
- Produced by: Bart Sibrel
- Narrated by: Anne Tonelson
- Edited by: Bart Sibrel
- Distributed by: AFTH, LLC
- Release date: January 18, 2001
- Running time: 47 minutes
- Country: United States
- Language: English

A Funny Thing Happened on the Way to the Moon is a 2001 film written, produced and directed by Nashville-based filmmaker Bart Sibrel. Sibrel is a proponent of the conspiracy theory that the six Apollo Moon landing missions between 1969 and 1972 were elaborate hoaxes perpetrated by the United States government, including NASA. The film is narrated by British stage actress Anne Tonelson.

== Overview ==
Buzz Aldrin on the Moon with Neil Armstrong reflection in his visor, Apollo 11, 1969

Sibrel claims that the Moon landing was a hoax, making claims about supposed photographic anomalies; disasters such as the destruction of Apollo 1; technical difficulties experienced in the 1950s and 1960s; and the problems of traversing the Van Allen radiation belts. Sibrel proposes that the most condemning evidence is a piece of footage that he claims was secret, and inadvertently sent to him by NASA; he alleges that the footage shows Apollo 11 astronauts attempting to create the illusion that they were 130,000 miles (210,000 km) from Earth (or roughly halfway to the Moon) when, he claims, they were only in a low Earth orbit.

The film also asserts that NASA's early inexperience in rocket technology and inconsistencies in NASA's records could point to a possible hoax, and that the Space Race was actually a race to develop armaments with the huge budget allocated to the Apollo missions. The film's premise is that NASA perpetrated a fraud because of the perception that if the United States could land men on the Moon before the Soviet Union, it would be a major victory in the Cold War, since the Soviets had been the first to achieve a successful space launch (Sputnik 1 in 1957), the first crewed space flight (Vostok 1 in 1961), and the first spacewalk (Voskhod 2 in 1965).

== Criticisms ==
Amanda Hess of The New York Times characterized the film as a "quasi-investigation". She referred to the film as a "'documentary'", in scare quotes, and to Sibrel as a "sincere kook", writing: "[A Funny Thing Happened on the Way to the Moon] mashed up moon footage with ominous shots from the Soviet Union and Vietnam, was narrated by a severe British woman and was sold on a website called MoonMovie.com."

Jim McDade, writing in The Birmingham News, wrote that A Funny Thing Happened on the Way to the Moon is "full of falsehoods, innuendo, strident accusations, half-truths, flawed logic and premature conclusions." According to McDade, the "only thing new and weird" in the film is that the claim that video views of Earth were actually filmed through a small hole to give the impression that Apollo 11 was not in low Earth orbit. "Bart has misinterpreted things that are immediately obvious to anyone who has extensively read Apollo history and documentation or anyone who has ever been inside an Apollo Command Module or accurate mockup", says McDade.

== See also ==
- Apollo 11 in popular culture
- Astronauts Gone Wild
- Moon landing conspiracy theories
