= The Living Matrix =

- Directed by: Greg Becker
- Written by: Greg Becker
- Produced by: Susan Wolf
- Starring: Adam Dreamhealer; Arielle Essex; Peter Fraser; Bruce Lipton; Marilyn Schlitz; Lynne McTaggart; Edgar D. Mitchell; Eric Pearl
- Cinematography: Greg Becker
- Edited by: Steven Farr
- Release date: March 2009
- Running time: 85 min.
- Countries: United States; Germany; Greece; Netherlands
- Language: English

The Living Matrix (Also Known As:Az élő mátrix) is a 2009 documentary film directed by Greg Becker. The film features Adam Dreamhealer, Arielle Essex, Peter Fraser, Bruce Lipton, Lynne McTaggart, Marilyn Schlitz and Edgar D. Mitchell.
