= Bill Kaysing =

Writer and conspiracy theorist (1922–2005)

- Kaysing in 2000
- Born: July 31, 1922; Chicago, Illinois
- Died: April 21, 2005 (aged 82); Santa Barbara, California
- Occupation: Author

William Charles Kaysing (July 31, 1922 – April 21, 2005) was an American author and conspiracy theorist who claimed that the Apollo Moon landings between 1969 and 1972 were hoaxes.

== Early life ==
Kaysing served as an officer in the United States Navy Reserve during World War II.

== Charges of an Apollo Hoax ==
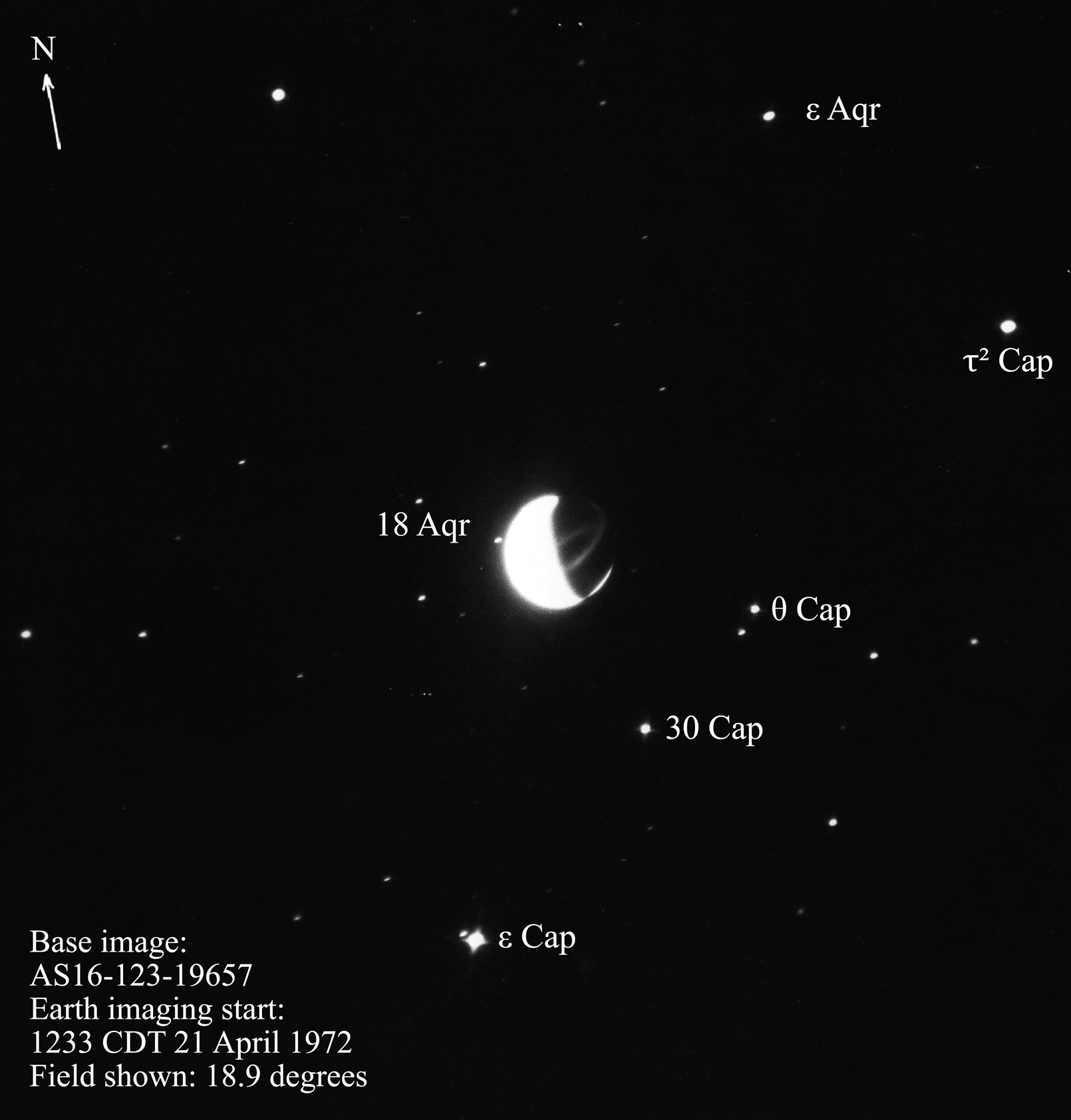
Long-exposure photo taken from the Moon's surface by Apollo 16 astronauts using the Far Ultraviolet Camera. It shows the Earth with the correct background of stars, which are named.

David Scott drops a hammer and feather on the Moon.

Kaysing asserted that during his much earlier tenure at Rocketdyne he was privy to documents pertaining to the Mercury, Gemini, Atlas, and Apollo programs, and argued that one did not need an engineering or science degree to determine that a hoax was being perpetrated. According to his account of this intellectual development, the Rocketdyne scientists with whom he worked expressed to him that there was enough technology at the time to perhaps send a crewed rocket to the Moon, but not enough technology developed to return safely to Earth. They also spoke of the very real problem of traveling through atmospheric radiation without harm to the astronauts as a problem that yet needed to be solved. Even before July 1969, he had "a hunch, an intuition, ... a true conviction" and decided that he did not believe that anyone was going to the Moon. Kaysing thus wrote a book titled We Never Went to the Moon: America's Thirty Billion Dollar Swindle, which was self-published in 1976, and republished by Health Research Books in 2002.

In his book, Kaysing introduced arguments which he said proved the Moon landings were faked. Claims in the book including that:

- NASA lacked the technical expertise to put a man on the Moon.
- the absence of stars in lunar surface photographs was indicative of a hoax.
- there were unexplained optical anomalies in the photographs taken on the Moon.
- there was an absence of blast craters beneath the Lunar Modules, and that the rocket engines of the Lunar Modules should have generated an enormous dust cloud near their landing sites during the final seconds of descent.
- the death of Thomas Baron, a quality control and safety inspector for North American Aviation, was mysterious and indicative of a hoax.

He also claimed that Dutch newspapers questioned the "authenticity" of the Moon landings.

=== Charges of other conspiracies ===
Kaysing also claimed that NASA staged both the Apollo 1 fire and the Space Shuttle Challenger accident, deliberately murdering the astronauts on board, suggesting that NASA might have learned that these astronauts were about to expose the conspiracy and needed to guarantee their silence. He also believed that the disappearance of Thomas Baron's 500-page report on the Apollo 1 fire and Baron's death in a rail-traffic accident a week after he testified before the United States Congress were not accidents.

A vocal advocate of other conspiracy theories, Kaysing believed there to be a high-level conspiracy involving the Central Intelligence Agency, Federal Reserve, Internal Revenue Service and other government agencies to brainwash the American public, poison their food supply, and control the media.

=== Media participations ===
Kaysing appeared on the Oprah show. He was also a participant in the Fox documentary, Conspiracy Theory: Did We Land on the Moon?, which aired on February 15, 2001. Kaysing had an appearance on the documentary, "Moon Landing - The World's Greatest Hoax?", which was uploaded to YouTube on March 5, 2021.

=== Lovell defamation lawsuit ===
On August 29, 1996, Kaysing filed a defamation lawsuit in Santa Cruz County Superior Court against astronaut Jim Lovell for calling his claims "wacky" in an article by Rafer Guzmán for Metro Silicon Valley. Lovell is quoted:

The guy is wacky. His position makes me feel angry. We spent a lot of time getting ready to go to the Moon. We spent a lot of money, we took great risks, and it's something everybody in this country should be proud of.

The case was dismissed in 1997.

==== Original theory from We Never Went to the Moon (1976) ====
Kaysing describes preparation for the launch as normal, but since Rocketdyne F-1 engines in the first stage of the Saturn V rocket were "totally unreliable," a cluster of "five booster engines of the more dependable B-1 type as used in the C-1 cluster for the Atlas missile" were secretly installed, one inside each of the Saturn V's five F-1s.

==== Revised theory from Conspiracy Theory: Did We Land on the Moon? (2001) ====
Kaysing states:

The astronauts were launched with the Saturn V. Then, in order to account for their disappearance, they simply orbited the Earth for eight days and in the interim they showed these fake pictures of the astronauts on the Moon. But on the eighth day the command console separated from the vehicle and descended to Earth as, of course, was shown in the films.

== Legacy ==
Kaysing encouraged Ralph René to write NASA Mooned America!, after René decided that he also had research to prove the landings were faked. Kaysing's daughter, Wendy L. Kaysing, has stated that she hopes to one day write a book about her father with Kaysing's nephew, Dietrich von Schmausen, not to reiterate Kaysing's hoax claims, rather to talk about her father as a person.

=== Fake tribute website and Flat Earth misappropriation ===
In the years following Kaysing's death, Italian conspiracist writer Albino Galuppini created the Bill Kaysing Tribute Website. This website was described as being “designed to pay tribute to a distinguished writer who lived his ideals and spoke his mind honestly and openly” and contained many personal photos provided by Kaysing's relatives and tributes written by his followers. Including Bart Sibrel, David Percy and Jarrah White.

From 2013 onward, Galuppini started publishing blog articles propagating false claims about the Earth being flat and all space travel being faked. Many of these articles misappropriated Kaysing's moon hoax views to promote Galuppini's Flat Earth claims. Despite Kaysing specifically theorizing that the astronauts orbited the Earth instead of going to the Moon, Galuppini falsely claimed that Kaysing denied any rocket could travel fast enough to get into orbit. This led to Kaysing's relatives and followers publicly withdrawing their endorsement from the Bill Kaysing Tribute Website, severing their ties with Galuppini, and no longer allowing him permission to use their content.

Wendy Kaysing stated "I cannot imagine my father ever saying that we could not do space travel. That's ludicrous! That’s ridiculous! ... Anybody who says that about my father is just trying to discredit my father's ability to even think" and requested that Galuppini cease and desist the “sale of books, articles, or publication of websites, blogs or public messages” that use her father's work. But Galuppini ignored her demands and continued the public façade of being a trusted friend of Kaysing's family and supporters. Jarrah White, a former contributor to the website, stated that Kaysing's legacy had essentially been "hijacked" and spoke harshly of Galuppini's Flat Earth nonsense and misappropriation in Popular Mechanics: "If you think the Earth is flat, then I don't consider you a serious researcher. I think you are a kindergarten dropout. Serious hoax researchers, they base their evidence on scientific and photographic anomalies and go where the evidence takes them. Flat-Earthers preemptively deny space travel in general because any photos of the Earth from space contradict their religion."

== Selected bibliography ==
- Kaysing, William (1966) [Originally published in Cycle World]. Intelligent Motorcycling. Illustrations by Jon Dahlstrom. Long Beach, Calif.: Parkhurst. OCLC 29211988.
- Kaysing, Bill (1970). Land and how to Buy it For a Few Dollars an Acre. Santa Barbara, Calif.: Paradise Publishers. OCLC 80342613.
- —— (1970). How to Eat Well on Less Than a Dollar a Day. Santa Barbara, Calif.: Paradise Publishers. OCLC 80843621.
- —— (1971). The Ex-urbanite's Complete & Illustrated Easy-does-it First-time Farmer's Guide: A Useful Book (1st ed.). San Francisco, Calif.: Straight Arrow Books. OCLC 162589.
- —— (1973). The Ex-urbanite's Complete & Illustrated Easy-does-it First-time Farmer's Guide: A Useful Book (Revised ed.). San Francisco, Calif.: Straight Arrow Books. ISBN 0-87932-047-8.
- —— (1974). The Robin Hood Handbook. New York: Links Books. ISBN 0-82563-024-X.
- ——; Kaysing, Ruth (1975). Eat Well on a Dollar a Day: Live a Healthier Life at a Fraction of the Cost. San Francisco, Calif.: Chronicle Books. ISBN 0-87701-066-8.
- —— (1976). Fell's Beginner's Guide to Motorcycling. New York, N.Y.: Frederick Fell Publishers, Inc. ISBN 0-81190-272-2.
- ——; Reid, Randy (1976). We Never Went to the Moon: America's Thirty Billion Dollar Swindle!. Fountain Valley, Calif.: Eden Press. OCLC 19542836.
- ——; Reid, Randy (1976). We Never Went to the Moon: America's Thirty Billion Dollar Swindle. Pomeroy, Wash.: Health Research Books. OCLC 47861692.
- —— (1977). Clark, Cathy (ed.). Privacy: How to Get It, How to Enjoy It. Fountain Valley, Calif.: Eden Press. OCLC 3892204.
- —— (1981). We Never Went to the Moon: America's 30 Billion Dollar Swindle. Cornville, Ariz.: Desert Publications. ISBN 0-87947-388-6.
- —— (1984). Great Hot Springs of the West. Santa Barbara, Calif.: Capra Press. ISBN 0-88496-211-3.
- —— (1987). Great Hideouts of the West: An Idea Book for Living Free. Port Townsend, Wash.: Loompanics Unlimited. ISBN 0-91517-962-8.
- —— (1987). The Senior Citizens' Survival Manual. Mission, Kansas: Bellwether Press. ISBN 0-94413-600-1.
- —— (1988). Bill Kaysing's Freedom Encyclopedia. New York, N.Y.: Instant Improvement. ISBN 0-94168-302-8.
- ——; Kaysing, Ruth (1996). Eat Well for 99 Cents a Meal. Port Townsend, Wash.: Loompanics Unlimited. ISBN 1-55950-137-5.
- ——; Kaysing, Ruth (1996). The 99¢ a Meal Cookbook. Port Townsend, Wash.: Loompanics Unlimited. ISBN 1-55950-140-5.

== See also ==
- Moon landing conspiracy theories
- Bart Sibrel
