= Thomas Barron =

Thomas Barron may refer to:

- Thomas Barron (trade unionist) (1873–1943), British trade unionist
- Thomas J. Barron (1903–1992), Irish folklorist and amateur historian
- T. A. Barron (Thomas Archibald Barron, born 1952), American author

== See also ==
- Thomas Baron (disambiguation)
- Thomas Barron House
