= Bart Sibrel =

American conspiracy theorist (born 1960s)

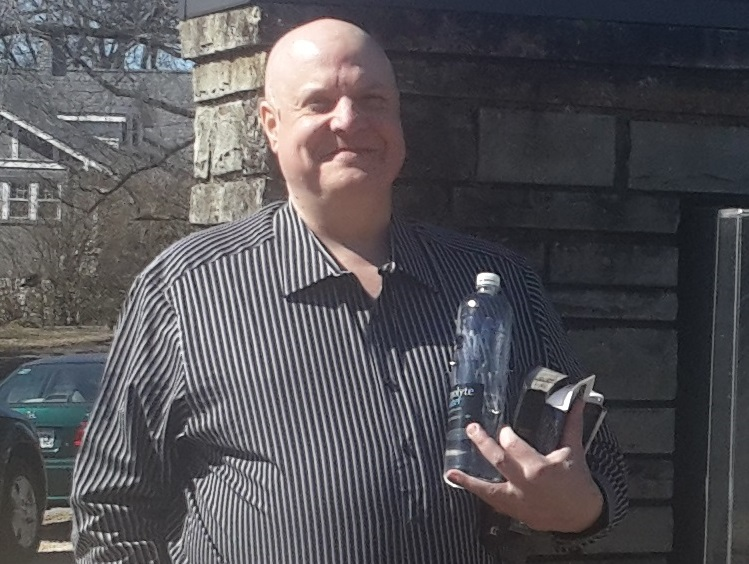
- Sibrel in 2014
- Born: 1964 or 1965 (age 61–62)
- Occupations: Filmmaker; writer; conspiracy theorist
- Years active: 1985–present
- Website: www.sibrel.com

Bart Winfield Sibrel (born 1964 or 1965) is an American conspiracy theorist who has written, produced, and directed films arguing that the Apollo Moon landings between 1969 and 1972 were staged by NASA under the control of the CIA. He has created four independent films promoting the ideas, with the first having been the film A Funny Thing Happened on the Way to the Moon (2001).

In his works, Sibrel films himself asking various Apollo astronauts to put their hand on the Bible and swear that they walked on the Moon. In the case of the Apollo 11 astronaut Buzz Aldrin, whom Sibrel arranged to meet on a false pretense, outside the Luxe Hotel in Beverly Hills, the interaction resulted in Aldrin punching Sibrel, which brought him significant publicity. However, no criminal charges were filed against Aldrin.

== Background ==
Sibrel has been a director of TV commercials and is sometimes identified as a maker of "documentaries" with respect to his self-released Moon landing denial films, though other sources point out the personal distribution, limited release, and style and content call into question placing Sibrel's work in this genre of filmmaking (e.g., with the St. Petersburg Times and The New York Times placing the word documentary in quotation marks in some of their reports). This concern relates in part to Sibrel's record of misrepresenting his identity to the subjects he attempts to interview, notably repeated attempts involving former astronauts including Buzz Aldrin, Neil Armstrong, Alan Bean, Eugene Cernan, and Edgar Mitchell (where Sibrel posed as filmmaker associated with the History Channel).

As of 2002, Sibrel was operating a video production company in Nashville, Tennessee, and had "made a career out of perpetuating the notion that NASA's Apollo moon missions were hoaxes."

Sibrel's single most notable work is a 47-minute video work likewise calling into question the historicity of the Apollo Moon missions; entitled A Funny Thing Happened on the Way to the Moon, Sibrel describes the Apollo program as a "Cold War CIA and Nixon administration deception." Amanda Hess, writing for The New York Times, alludes to the work as a pseudo-documentary, and describes the work in this way: "It mashed up moon footage with ominous shots from the Soviet Union and Vietnam, was narrated by a severe British woman and was sold on a [personal] website called MoonMovie.com." Sibrel confronted several Apollo astronauts in the preparation of his videos, all of whom responded indifferently or negatively when they realized that they were being challenged on their achievement of landing and walking on the Moon. The Bart Sibrel YouTube channel was later demonetized in 2019.

=== Moon landing denial ===
In a July 2019 HBO interview, Sibrel stated the following main reasons that he believed the Apollo missions were a fake:

- Apollo's achievement with its 50-year-old technology cannot be reproduced in 2019 by any nation in the world, including the United States (only now is modern technology capable of faking the Moon landings).
- The shadows appearing in one of the Apollo 11 photographs are not parallel, and therefore must have been taken in a studio with multiple light sources (in fact this is consistent with reflection from the lunar surface and inconsistent with the existence of only one shadow per object).
- The Van Allen radiation belt that exists around the Earth does not allow humans to pass through it due to its extreme radiation (the Apollo 11 crew were within the belts for under two hours so would have been exposed to an estimated 18 rads – well within safe limits).

All the common Moon landing denial theories, including Sibrel's and others, have been repeatedly debunked.

== Aldrin incident ==
External videos
- Buzz Aldrin punches Sibrel

One confrontational incident involved Apollo 11 crew member Buzz Aldrin. Earlier, Sibrel had interviewed Aldrin in a hotel room for his film Astronauts Gone Wild. In that interview, Sibrel confronted Aldrin with purported newly discovered footage from the Apollo 11 mission, to which Aldrin replied: "Well, you're talking to the wrong guy! Why don't you talk to the administrator at NASA? We were passengers, we're guys going on a flight." Sibrel refers, in post hoc interviews, to two confrontations with Aldrin prior to the one that resulted in his being punched.

Regarding the subsequent interaction, occurring on September 9, 2002, the BBC reported that witnesses came forward to the police with jurisdiction, the Beverly Hills Police Department, stating: "Mr Sibrel...lured Mr Aldrin to the hotel under false pretences in order to interview him." By Aldrin's account, he went to the Beverly Hills hotel on that date under the pretext of an interview on space for a Japanese children's television show. At the time, Aldrin was aged 72 and Sibrel was aged 37.

Sibrel attempted on-camera to coerce Aldrin to swear an oath on a Bible that he had been on the Moon. Witnesses came forward to the police indicating that "Sibrel had aggressively poked Mr Aldrin with the Bible". When Aldrin refused Sibrel's request, Sibrel followed him, still being recorded by Sibrel's camera crew, saying: "You're the one who said you walked on the Moon when you didn't." Aldrin responded with "Will you get away from me?" — when Sibrel now called him 'a coward, a liar and a thief', Aldrin punched Sibrel in the jaw.

On the day following the altercation, a statement from a lawyer for Aldrin described the "6-foot-2, 250-pound [1.88 m, 113 kg] Sibrel forc[ing] Aldrin up against a wall and refus[ing] to let him leave", thus making the case for self-defense. Aldrin made the case to police that he had been attempting to defend "himself and his stepdaughter, who was with him at the time".

Sibrel gave the tape to the police, apparently alleging assault. The incident received significant publicity, with many television talk shows airing the clip, usually supporting Aldrin's action. Shortly after the altercation, Sibrel told the St. Petersburg Times: "[Aldrin] has a good punch. It was quick, too. I didn't see it coming."

As described by Eric Spitznagel for Popular Mechanics, since "witnesses testified that Sibrel had provoked [Aldrin], assault charges against the former astronaut were dropped". Police either did not file or dropped charges based on Aldrin's lack of a prior criminal record, witness accounts of Sibrel's having drawn Aldrin to the hotel under false pretenses, Sibrel's aggressiveness before the punch, and his having declined to seek medical attention and sustaining "no visible injury".

== Conviction for vandalism in parking dispute ==
In July 2009, Sibrel, who at the time was working as a Nashville taxicab driver, was charged with vandalism when he jumped up and down on the hood of a car owned by a woman with whom he was having a parking dispute. Court documents show he was arrested after the driver refused to pull out of a parking space he wanted. The arresting officer wrote, "A few moments later the parking space in front of the victim opened up and Sibrel drove into it and parked." Sibrel "then walked up to the victim's car and jumped onto the hood, and then jumped up and down several times." The report says he caused $1,431 worth of damage, after which Sibrel pleaded guilty to vandalism and was placed on probation.

== Filmography ==
=== Regarding the Apollo program ===
Year	Film	Director	Producer	Writer	Run time (minutes)
2001	A Funny Thing Happened on the Way to the Moon	Yes	Yes	Yes	47
2004	Astronauts Gone Wild: An Investigation Into the Authenticity of the Moon Landings	Yes	Yes		53
2004	Apollo 11 Monkey Business: False Photography Unedited		Yes		108
2004	Apollo 11 Post-Flight Press Conference		Yes		83

== See also ==
- Bill Kaysing – Writer and conspiracy theorist (1992–2005)

== Further reading and viewing ==
- "Moon Hoax Spurs Crusade Against Bad Astronomy". The New York Times. Reuters. January 11, 2001.
- Plait, Phil (February 13, 2001). "Fox TV and the Apollo Moon Hoax". BadAstronomy.com. [A thorough rebuttal of the 2001 re-airing of the Fox TV program, Conspiracy Theory: Did We Land on the Moon?.]
- "Buzz Aldrin Punches a Jerk in the Face for Calling Him a Liar". The Week. July 21, 2014.
- "Buzz Aldrin Punches Moon-landing Conspiracy Theorist". The Committee for Skeptical Inquiry. October 16, 2002.
- Tim Binall (November 25, 2006). "BoA: Audio, Season Two: Bart Sibrel". Binall of America (Podcast). [Audio blog featuring the title subject.]
- McKeegan, Dave (May 29, 2024). Exposing the lies of Bart Sibrel (video). YouTube. [A thorough rebuttal of Bart Sibrel's claims about the moonlanding, part of his three hour-long appearance in The Joe Rogan Experience (April 25, 2024), which is linked in the video's description.]
