= Thomas Baron =

Safety inspector and whistle blower

- Born: Thomas Ronald Baron c.1938 Wilkes-Barre, Pennsylvania, United States
- Died: April 27, 1967 (aged 28–29); Mims, Florida, United States
- Occupations: quality control and safety inspector
- Known for: 169-page report critical of safety standards at North American Aviation
- Notable work: 275-page report on NASA safety protocol violations after Apollo 1 fire

Thomas Ronald "Tom" Baron (c. 1938 – April 27, 1967) was a quality control and safety inspector for North American Aviation (NAA), when NAA was the primary contractor to build the Apollo command module.

== Early life and education ==
Baron was born in or around 1938, in Wilkes-Barre, Pennsylvania. He attended Liberty High School in Bethlehem, Pennsylvania.

== Career ==
Baron initially enlisted in the U.S. Air Force, where he was stationed at Eglin Air Force Base in Okaloosa County, Florida. He was later hired as a quality control inspector with North American Aviation, the prime NASA contractor for construction of the Apollo spaceship.

=== Whistleblower report ===
Baron compiled a 169-page report critical of safety standards at North American Aviation, and leaked his report to the media. After NAA learned of this, they fired him.

After the Apollo 1 fire, Baron wrote a 275-page report on NASA safety protocol violations, which he gave to Rep. Olin E. Teague's investigation at Cape Kennedy in Florida, on April 21, 1967.

The chairman of the NASA Oversight Committee claimed that Baron had made a valuable contribution to the Apollo fire probe, but that he had been "overzealous".

== Death ==
Six days after his testimony, Baron died instantly, along with his wife and stepdaughter, when a train crashed into their car near their home in Mims, Florida.
