= Moon landing conspiracy theories in popular culture =

The notion that the Apollo Moon landings were hoaxes perpetrated by NASA and other agencies has appeared many times in popular culture. Not all references to Moon landing conspiracy theories are in support of them, but the ideas expressed in them have become a popular meme to reference, both in humor and sincerity.

== Precursors in other media ==
In 1956 James E. Gunn wrote a science fiction story entitled "Cave of Night" in which the United States Air Force fakes the first crewed American spaceflight. When lack of funds precludes a survivable crewed mission, the mission is faked to spur funding for a real space program. The Air Force launches the craft carrying a transmitter relaying prerecorded messages from the pilot. The Air Force later claims that the astronaut died in orbit, and that his body will remain in orbit until the craft disintegrates in the atmosphere. The conspiracy is nearly exposed by a radio reporter who sees the astronaut on Earth after his supposed "death," but he is forced to destroy his evidence by the government. "Cave of Night" was adapted for radio and broadcast as an episode of the radio series X Minus One on February 1, 1956, five years before Yuri Gagarin's first crewed spaceflight.

== In print ==
- Former President Bill Clinton in his 2004 autobiography, My Life, states: "Just a month before, Apollo 11 astronauts Buzz Aldrin and Neil Armstrong had left their colleague, Michael Collins, aboard spaceship Columbia and walked on the moon...The old carpenter asked me if I really believed it happened. I said sure, I saw it on television. He disagreed; he said that he didn't believe it for a minute, that 'them television fellers' could make things look real that weren't. Back then, I thought he was a crank. During my eight years in Washington, I saw some things on TV that made me wonder if he wasn't ahead of his time."
- Norman Mailer in 1969 wrote: "The event was so removed, however, so unreal, that no objective correlative existed to prove it had not conceivably been an event staged in a television studio—the greatest con of the century—and indeed a good mind, product of the iniquities, treacheries, gold, passion, invention, ruse, deception and rich worldly stink of the Renaissance could hardly deny that the event if bogus was as great a creation in mass hoodwinking, deception and legerdemain as the true ascent was in technology, engineering and physics."

== In film ==
- In the 1971 James Bond film Diamonds Are Forever, a brief scene depicts the action taking place in a Moon setting where astronauts are being trained. James Bond steals what appears to be a Moon buggy from the model set, and drives it off to escape from an enemy compound. This scene may have helped to spread the idea of the Moon landings being a hoax. However, model sets like the one in the film had been used prior to the Moon landing in order to simulate conditions.
- The 1978 film Capricorn One portrayed a fictional NASA attempt to fake a landing on the planet Mars, in a plot inspired by Apollo hoax theories.
- In the 2009 film Futurama: Into the Wild Green Yonder, Fry reads Richard Nixon's mind and learns that the president staged the Moon landing, but it took place on the planet Venus.
- The 2012 documentary Room 237 featured film analysis by fans of Stanley Kubrick's 1980 film The Shining, connecting Kubrick's film with the Apollo 11 Moon landing and other major events. (See 2012 video by Michael Wysmierski below.)
- In the 2015 comedy film Moonwalkers, a CIA agent tries to hire Stanley Kubrick for the Apollo 11 Moon landing scene.
- The 2016 film Operation Avalanche is about CIA agents who, when they find NASA is incapable of meeting the 1969 deadline for the Apollo 11 Moon landing, simulate the landing with a film crew.
- The 2024 romantic-comedy Fly Me to the Moon depicts the creation of a fictionalized version of the Apollo 11 mission in case the actual one is not successful.

== On television ==
- In 2002, the Franco-German television network Arte aired the spoof documentary Dark Side of the Moon, 'exposing' how Stanley Kubrick was recruited to fake the Moon landings. It featured interviews with Kubrick's widow and a number of American statesmen. including Henry Kissinger and Donald Rumsfeld. The interviews and other footage were presented out of context and in some cases completely staged, with actors playing interviewees who had never existed—and named, in many cases, after characters from Kubrick's films; this was one of many clues included to reveal the joke to the alert viewer.
- In the Futurama episode "Roswell That Ends Well," President Harry S. Truman orders the creation of NASA after cancelling the faked Moon landing. He admonishes them "to get off their fannies" and get to work.
- The August 27, 2008, MythBusters episode "NASA Moon Landing" tested and debunked common claims made by Moon landing conspiracy theorists.
- On the SyFy show Fact or Faked: Paranormal Files lead investigator Ben Hansen and his team investigate on whether or not the Moon landing could have been faked. They claimed this proved it could have been faked but they all believe that it happened for real.
- In the Friends episode "The One With Rachel's Other Sister," Joey needs a lie and Phoebe suggest man walking on the Moon, replying, "you can see the strings people!"
- During an episode of QI, the panel discussed the Moon landing, and the various conspiracies surrounding it. All of them agreed that the landing did take place, although Alan Davies admitted he used to believe some of the photographs were faked, until he worked with Sir Patrick Moore who angrily pointed out how much work he had put into mapping out the Moon for NASA. According to Alan, Moore also said that if he met Alan again, he would be sick in his eye. Host Stephen Fry summed up by saying that "for every ill-conceived argument that the Moon landings were a hoax, there's a perfectly logical explanation to put our minds at rest."
- The faking of the Moon landing, along with conspiracy theories concerning the Kennedy assassination and alien coverups, made a prominent appearance in a 2005 episode of Fat Pizza. The events of this episode were revisited and expanded on in two 2019 episodes, the latter of which included a cameo by real-life Moon hoax proponent Jarrah White.
- On a 2009 episode of Mock the Week, one of the questions was about the 40th anniversary of the Moon landing. Frankie Boyle went into a short but furious rant about how it couldn't have happened, citing NASA's technical failures over the years as proof that they were incapable of such a thing. Hugh Dennis jokingly suggested that the "faked Moon landing" Boyle was actually thinking of was "the one with Wallace & Gromit."
- In the Elementary episode "The Red Team," Sherlock Holmes interrogates a suspect who along with the victim, believed Neil Armstrong did not walk on the Moon.

== Other references ==
- British weekly sci-fi comic 2000 AD published a story claiming the Apollo landings were faked to mask the existence of an advanced space program that had been active since 1950 - a deliberate reversal of the usual hoax argument.
- Former Major League Baseball player Carl Everett has said in interviews with The Boston Globe columnist Dan Shaughnessy that he doubts the validity of the Moon landings. Shaughnessy would go on to nickname Everett "Jurassic Carl" due to Everett's assertion that dinosaurs never existed.
- In 2002's Grand Theft Auto: Vice City, players can find a Moon landing set at the buyable film studio. The lot shows the Moon landing may have been faked in the Grand Theft Auto universe.
- The Onion spoofed the theory in an article reporting that Neil Armstrong had become convinced that the Moon landing was a hoax. The joke article was mistakenly reported by a Bangladeshi newspaper, The Daily Manab Zamin, as news.
- Commentator Joe Rogan has been open on his podcasts and interviews that he used to question the Moon landing.
- Actress Whoopi Goldberg seriously asked on The View, "Why is the flag rippling? There’s no air."
- On Real Time with Bill Maher, rapper Mos Def stated that he did not believe that men landed on the Moon.
- In a 2009 interview, Canadian novelist Margaret Atwood questioned the technology of the 1960s, why man hasn't landed on the Moon again, and mentioned the shadow discrepancies as well as the radiation belts.
- The music video for Rammstein's 2004 song "Amerika" shows the band in Apollo-era spacesuits on the Moon. At the end of the video, it is revealed that the band have actually been on a fake Moon set in a studio. A documentary on the making of the video was also produced.
- A 2012 video by Michael Wysmierski, The Shining Code 2.0, puts forth the argument that Stanley Kubrick's 1980 film The Shining was made as a coded confession of his role in faking the Apollo 11 landing.
- The 2013 music video for the song "On Top of the World" by Imagine Dragons portrays Stanley Kubrick filming the Apollo 11 landing.
- In an April 2013 interview by We Are Change, comedian Russell Peters stated that he was not "a big believer in the Moon landing."
- The founder and followers of the International Society for Krishna Consciousness (better known as the Hare Krishna movement) famously believe that the Moon landings must have been faked for reasons ranging from the Moon being further away from the Earth than the Sun to the notion that the god of vegetation resides on the Moon and would never allow a landing.

== See also ==
- Third-party evidence for Apollo Moon landings
