= Third-party evidence for Apollo Moon landings =

Independent confirmations of Apollo Moon landings

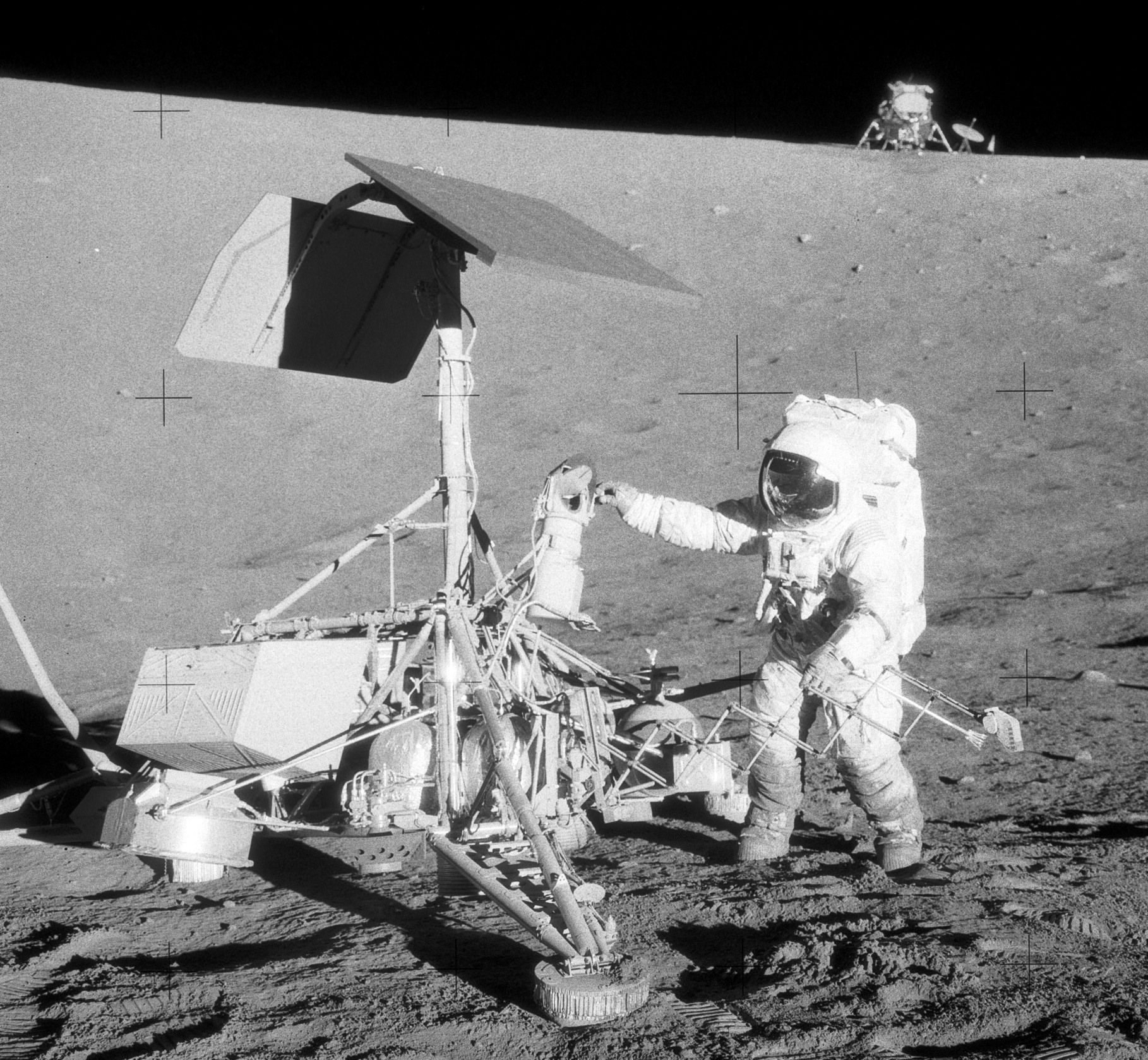
Photograph AS12-48-7134: Apollo 12 astronaut Pete Conrad with the uncrewed Surveyor 3, which had landed on the Moon in 1967. Parts of Surveyor were brought back to Earth by Apollo 12. The camera (near Conrad's right hand) is on display at the National Air and Space Museum

Third-party evidence for the Apollo Moon landings is evidence or analysis of evidence about the Apollo Moon landings that does not come from the U.S. government (the first party) or from Moon landing hoax theorists (the second party). This evidence provides independent confirmation of NASA's account of the six lunar missions carried out between 1969 and 1972.

== Independent evidence ==
In this section are only those observations that are completely independent of NASA—no NASA facilities were used, and there was no NASA funding. Each of the countries mentioned in this section (Soviet Union, Japan, China, and India) has its own space program, builds its own space probes which are launched on their own launch vehicles, and has its own deep space communication network.

=== SELENE photographs ===
In 2008, the Japan Aerospace Exploration Agency (JAXA) SELENE lunar probe obtained several photographs showing evidence of Moon landings. On the left are two photographs taken on the lunar surface by astronauts on August 2, 1971 during the third Apollo 15 moonwalk at station 9A near Hadley Rille. On the right is a 2008 reconstruction from images taken by the SELENE terrain camera and 3D projected to the same vantage point as the surface photos. The terrain is a close match within the SELENE camera resolution of 10 metres.

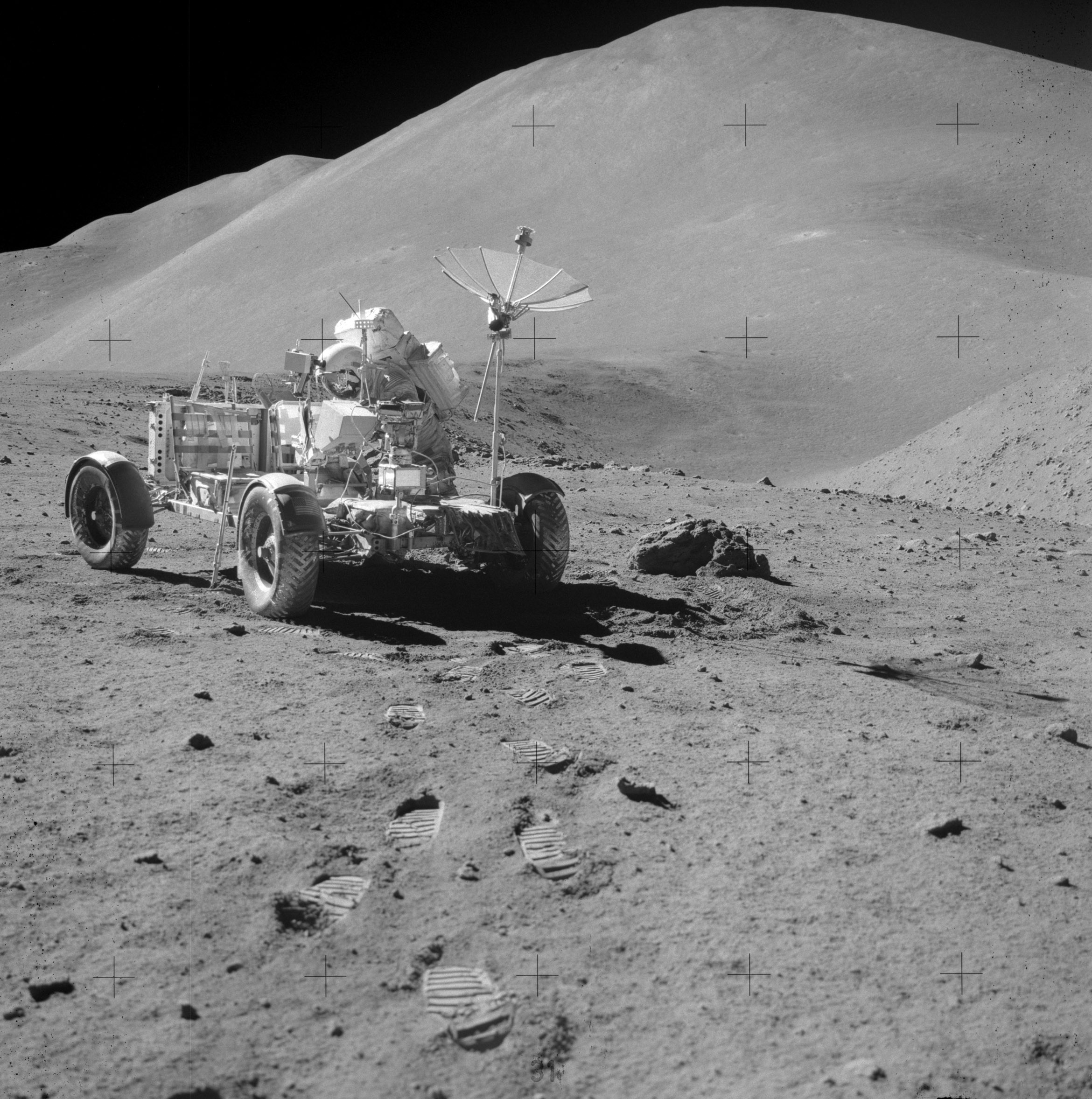
AS15-82-11121: Apollo 15 Lunar Roving Vehicle

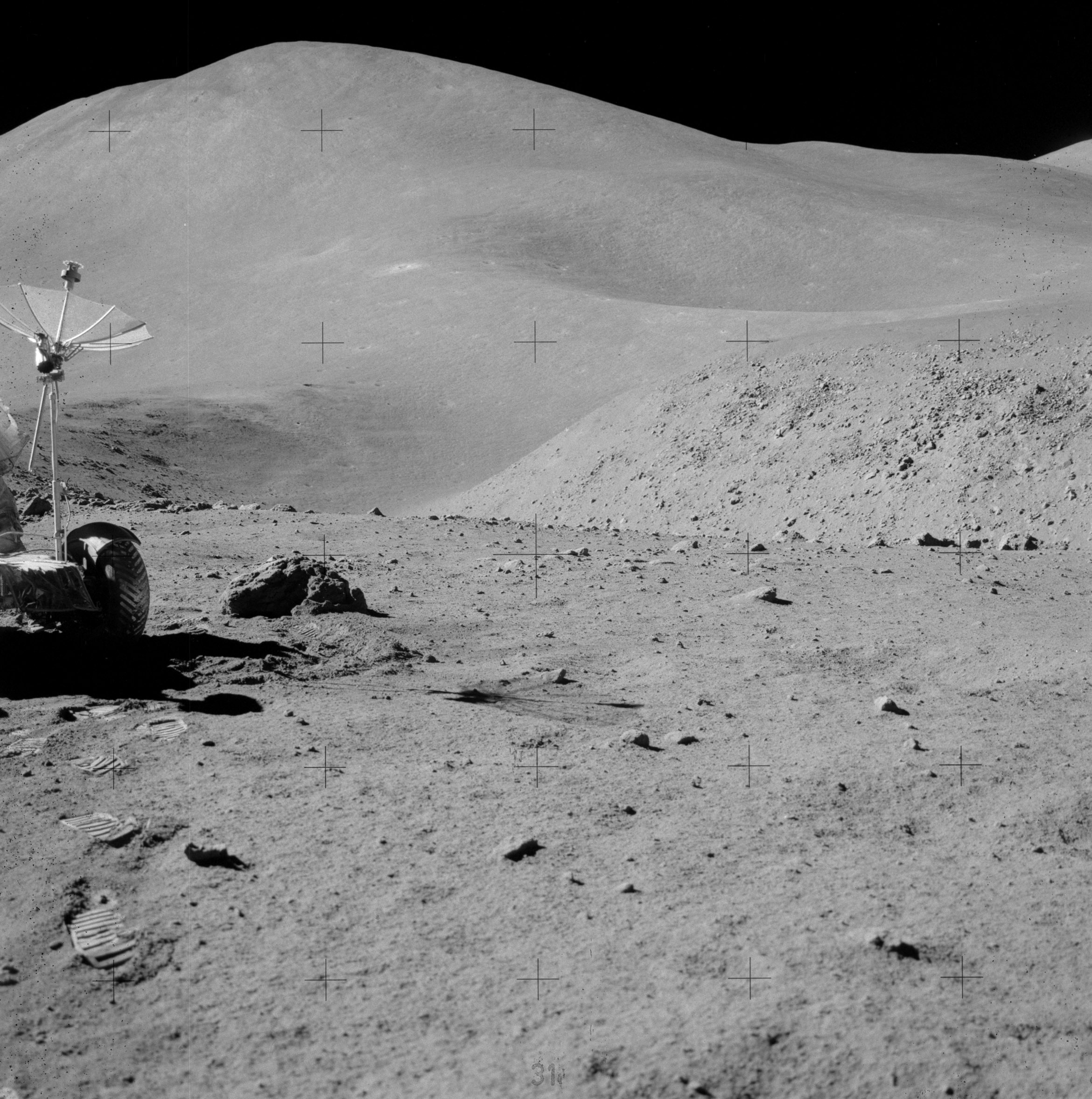
AS15-82-11122: Apollo 15 photo

3D SELENE reconstructed photo

The light-colored area of blown lunar surface dust created by the Lunar Module Falcon engine blast at the Apollo 15 landing site was photographed and confirmed by comparative analysis of photographs in May 2008. They correspond well to photographs taken from the Apollo 15 Command/Service Module showing a change in surface reflectivity due to the plume. This was the first visible trace of crewed landings on the Moon seen from space since the close of the Apollo program.

=== Chandrayaan-1 ===
As with SELENE, the Terrain Mapping Camera of India's Chandrayaan-1 probe did not have enough resolution to record Apollo hardware. Nevertheless, as with SELENE, Chandrayaan-1 independently recorded evidence of lighter, disturbed soil around the Apollo 15 site.

=== Chandrayaan-2 ===
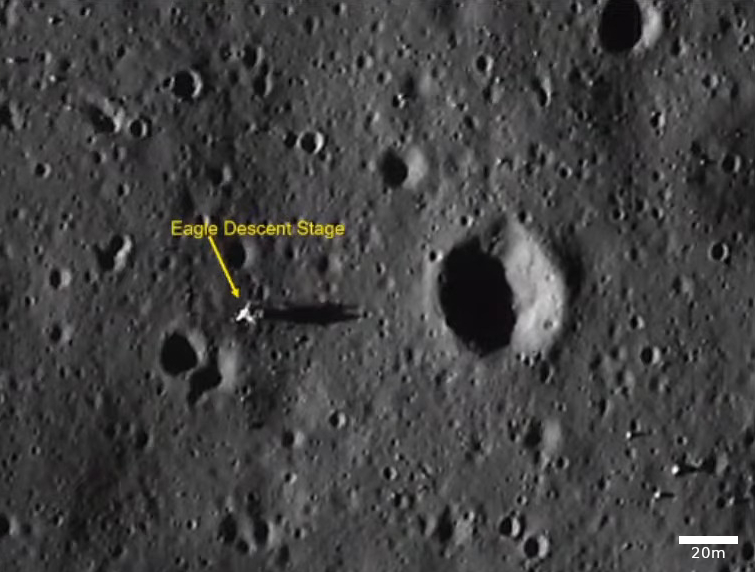
Chandrayaan-2 image of the Lunar Module Eagle descent stage at Tranquility Base

In April 2021 the ISRO Chandrayaan-2 orbiter captured an image of the Apollo 11 Lunar Module Eagle descent stage. The orbiter's image of Tranquility Base, the Apollo 11 landing site, was released to the public in a presentation on September 3, 2021.

=== Chang'e 2 ===
China's second lunar probe, Chang'e 2, which was launched in 2010 is capable of capturing lunar surface images with a resolution of up to 1.3 metres. It claims to have spotted traces of the Apollo landings and the lunar Rover, though the relevant imagery has not been publicly identified.

=== Danuri ===
South Korea's lunar probe, Danuri, which was launched in 2022 is capable of capturing lunar surface images. It imaged both Apollo 11 and Apollo 17 landing sites in 2023, with a good enough resolution to spot the landers.

=== Apollo missions tracked by independent parties ===
Aside from NASA, a number of entities and individuals observed, through various means, the Apollo missions as they took place. On later missions, NASA released information to the public explaining where third party observers could expect to see the various craft at specific times according to scheduled launch times and planned trajectories.

==== Observers of all missions ====
The Soviet Union monitored the missions at their Space Transmissions Corps, which was "fully equipped with the latest intelligence-gathering and surveillance equipment". Vasily Mishin, in an interview for the article "The Moon Programme That Faltered", describes how the Soviet Moon programme dwindled after the Apollo landing.

The missions were tracked by radar from several countries on the way to the Moon and back.

==== Kettering Grammar School ====
A group at Kettering Grammar School, using simple radio equipment, monitored Soviet and U.S. spacecraft and calculated their orbits. According to the group, in December 1972 a member "picks up Apollo 17 on its way to the Moon".

==== Apollo 8 ====
Apollo 8 was the first crewed mission to orbit the Moon, but did not land.

- On December 21, 1968, at 18:00 UT, amateur astronomers (H. R. Hatfield, M. J. Hendrie, F. Kent, Alan Heath, and M. J. Oates) in the UK photographed a fuel dump from the jettisoned S-IVB third rocket stage.
- Pic du Midi Observatory (in the French Pyrenees); the Catalina Station of the Lunar and Planetary Laboratory (University of Arizona); Corralitos Observatory, New Mexico, then operated by Northwestern University; McDonald Observatory of the University of Texas; and Lick Observatory of the University of California all filed reports of observations.
- Dr. Michael Moutsoulas at Pic du Midi Observatory reported an initial sighting around 17:10 UT on December 21 with the 1.1-metre reflector as an object (magnitude near 10, through clouds) moving eastward near the predicted location of Apollo 8. He used a 60 cm refractor telescope to observe a cluster of objects which were obscured by the appearance of a nebulous cloud at a time which matches a firing of the service module engine to assure adequate separation from the S-IVB. This event can be traced with the Apollo 8 Flight Journal, noting that launch was at 0751 EST or 12:51 UT on December 21.
- Justus Dunlap and others at Corralitos Observatory (then operated by Northwestern University) obtained over 400 short-exposure intensified images, giving very accurate locations for the spacecraft.
- The 2.1 m Otto Struve Telescope at McDonald Observatory, from 01:50 to 2:37 UT on December 23, observed the brightest object flashing as bright as magnitude 15, with the flash pattern recurring about once a minute.
- The Lick Observatory observations during the return coast to Earth produced live television pictures broadcast to United States west coast viewers via KQED-TV in San Francisco.
- An article in the March 1969 issue of Sky & Telescope contained many reports of optical tracking of Apollo 8.
- The first post-launch sightings were from the Smithsonian Astrophysical Observatory (SAO) station on Maui. Many in Hawaii observed the trans-lunar injection burn near 15:44 UT on December 21.

==== Apollo 10 ====
Like Apollo 8, Apollo 10 orbited the Moon but did not land.

- A list of sightings of Apollo 10 were reported in "Apollo 10 Optical Tracking" by Sky & Telescope magazine, July 1969, pp. 62–63.
- During the Apollo 10 mission The Corralitos Observatory was linked with the CBS news network. Images of the spacecraft going to the Moon were broadcast live.

==== Apollo 11 ====
- The Bochum Observatory director (Professor Heinz Kaminski) was able to provide confirmation of events and data independent of both the Russian and U.S. space agencies.
- A compilation of sightings appeared in "Observations of Apollo 11" by Sky and Telescope magazine, November 1969.
- At Jodrell Bank Observatory in the UK, the telescope was used to observe the mission, as it was used years previously for Sputnik. At the same time, Jodrell Bank scientists were tracking the uncrewed Soviet spacecraft Luna 15, which was trying to land on the Moon. In July 2009, Jodrell released some recordings they made.
- Larry Baysinger, a radio amateur (W4EJA) and a technician for WHAS radio in Louisville, Kentucky, independently detected and recorded transmissions between the Apollo 11 astronauts on the lunar surface and the Lunar Module. Recordings made by Baysinger share certain characteristics with recordings made at Bochum Observatory by Kaminski, in that both Kaminski's and Baysinger's recordings do not include the Capsule Communicator (CAPCOM) in Houston, Texas, and the associated Quindar tones heard in NASA audio and seen on NASA Apollo 11 transcripts. Kaminski and Baysinger could only hear the transmissions from the Moon, and not transmissions to the Moon from the Earth.
- The Arcetri Observatory near Florence, Italy, also detected transmissions coming from the mission using a 10-meter dish.

==== Apollo 12 ====
Paul Maley reports several sightings of the Apollo 12 Command Module.

Sky and Telescope magazine published reports of the optical sighting of this mission.

==== Apollo 13 ====
Apollo 13 was intended to land on the Moon, but an oxygen tank explosion resulted in the mission being aborted after trans-lunar injection. It flew by the Moon but did not orbit or land.

Chabot Observatory calendar records an application of optical tracking during the final phases of Apollo 13, on April 17, 1970:

Rachel, Chabot Observatory's 20-inch refracting telescope, helps bring Apollo 13 and its crew home. One last burn of the lunar lander engines was needed before the crippled spacecraft's re-entry into the Earth's atmosphere. In order to compute that last burn, NASA needed a precise position of the spacecraft, obtainable only by telescopic observation. All the observatories that could have done this were clouded over, except Oakland's Chabot Observatory, where members of the Eastbay Astronomical Society had been tracking the Moon flights. EAS members received an urgent call from NASA Ames Research Station, which had ties with Chabot's educational program since the 60s, and they put the Observatory's historic 20-inch refractor to work. They were able to send the needed data to Ames, and the Apollo crew was able to make the needed correction and to return safely to Earth on this date in 1970.

==== Apollo 14 ====
Corralitos Observatory photographed Apollo 14.

Sky and Telescope magazine published reports of the optical sighting of this mission.

==== Apollo 15 ====
Paul Wilson and Richard T. Knadle, Jr. received voice transmissions from the Command/Service Module in lunar orbit on the morning of August 1, 1971. In an article for QST magazine they provide a detailed description of their work, with photographs.

==== Apollo 16 ====
Jewett Observatory at Washington State University reported sightings of Apollo 16.

At least two different radio amateurs, W4HHK and K2RIW, reported reception of Apollo 16 signals with home-built equipment.

Bochum Observatory tracked the astronauts and intercepted the television signals from Apollo 16. The image was re-recorded in black and white in the 625 lines, 25 frames/s television standard onto 2-inch videotape using their sole quad machine. The transmissions are only of the astronauts and do not contain any voice from Houston, as the signal received came from the Moon only. The videotapes are held in storage at the observatory.

==== Apollo 17 ====
Sven Grahn of the Swedish space program has described several amateur sightings of Apollo 17.

== Independent research consistent with NASA claims ==
In this section is evidence, by independent researchers, that NASA's account is correct. However, at least somewhere in the investigation, there was some NASA involvement, or use of US government resources.

=== Existence and age of Moon rocks ===
A total of 382 kilograms (842 lb) of Moon rocks and dust were collected during the Apollo 11, 12, 14, 15, 16 and 17 missions. Some 10 kg (22 lb) of the Moon rocks have been used in hundreds of experiments performed by both NASA researchers and planetary scientists at research institutions unaffiliated with NASA. These experiments have confirmed the age and origin of the rocks as lunar, and were used to identify lunar meteorites collected later from Antarctica. The oldest Moon rocks are up to 4.5 billion years old, making them 200 million years older than the oldest Earth rocks, which are from the Hadean eon and dated 3.8 to 4.3 billion years ago. The rocks returned by Apollo are very close in composition to the samples returned by the independent Soviet Luna programme. A rock brought back by Apollo 17 was dated to be 4.417 billion years old, with a margin of error of plus or minus 6 million years. The test was done by a group of researchers headed by Alexander Nemchin at Curtin University of Technology in Bentley, Australia.

=== Retroreflectors ===
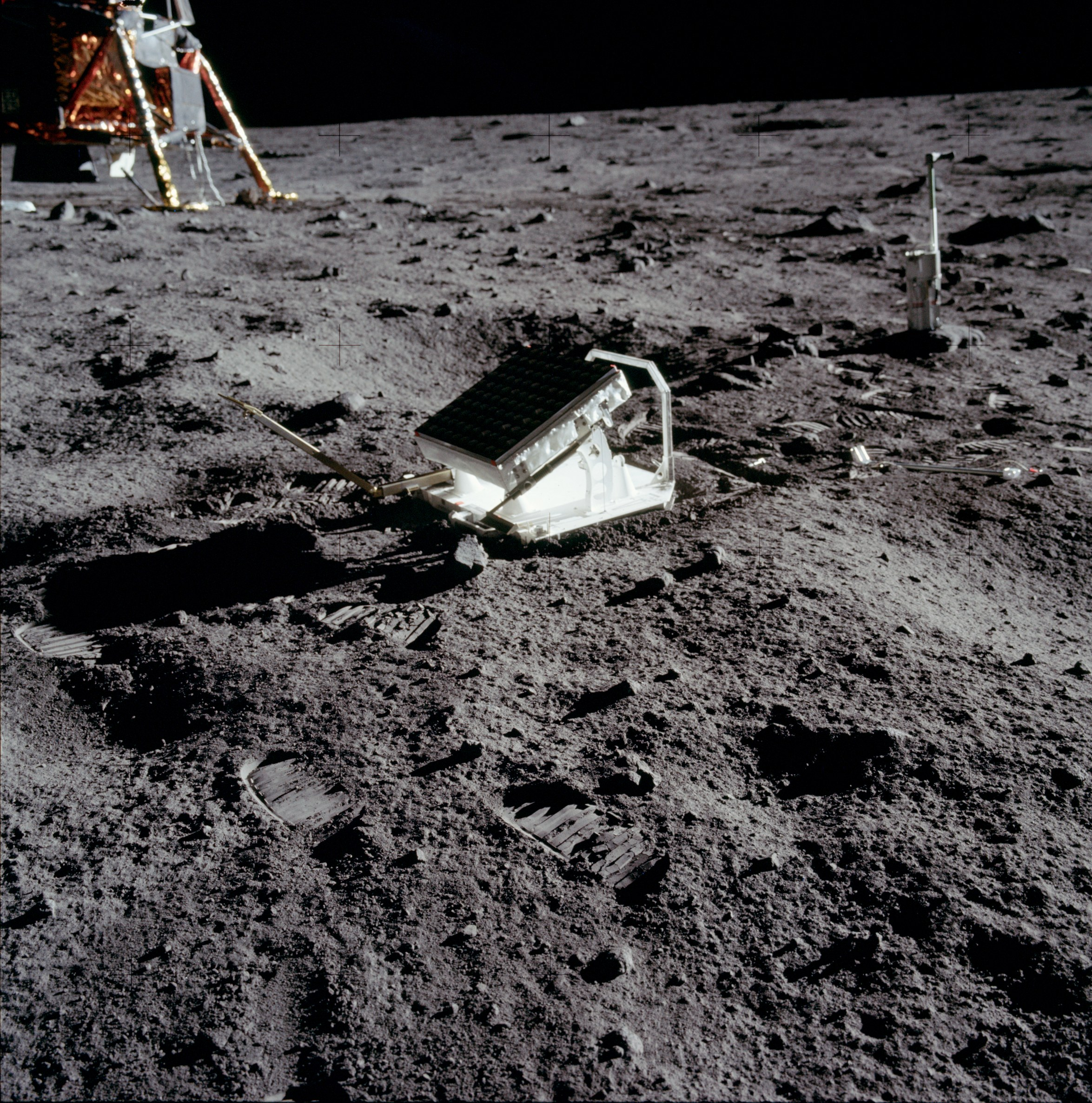
AS11-40-5952: Lunar Laser Ranging Experiment as left on the Moon by Apollo 11

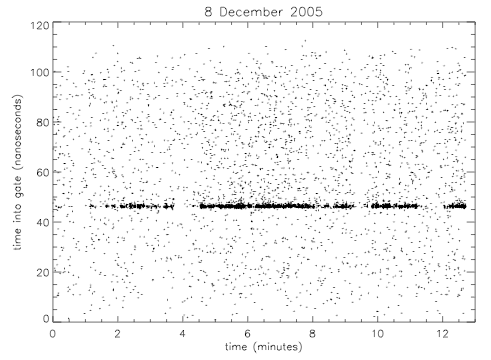
Plot of arrival time of photons (Y axis) for each of many laser pulses sent to the Moon (X axis). This data, along with similar data from the other landing sites, shows there are man-made objects on the Moon in the locations of the Apollo landings. Credit: The APOLLO (Lunar Laser Ranging) Collaboration

The detection on Earth of reflections from laser ranging retro-reflectors (LRRRs, or arrays of corner-cube prisms used as targets for Earth-based tracking lasers) on Lunar Laser Ranging experiments left on the Moon is evidence of landings.

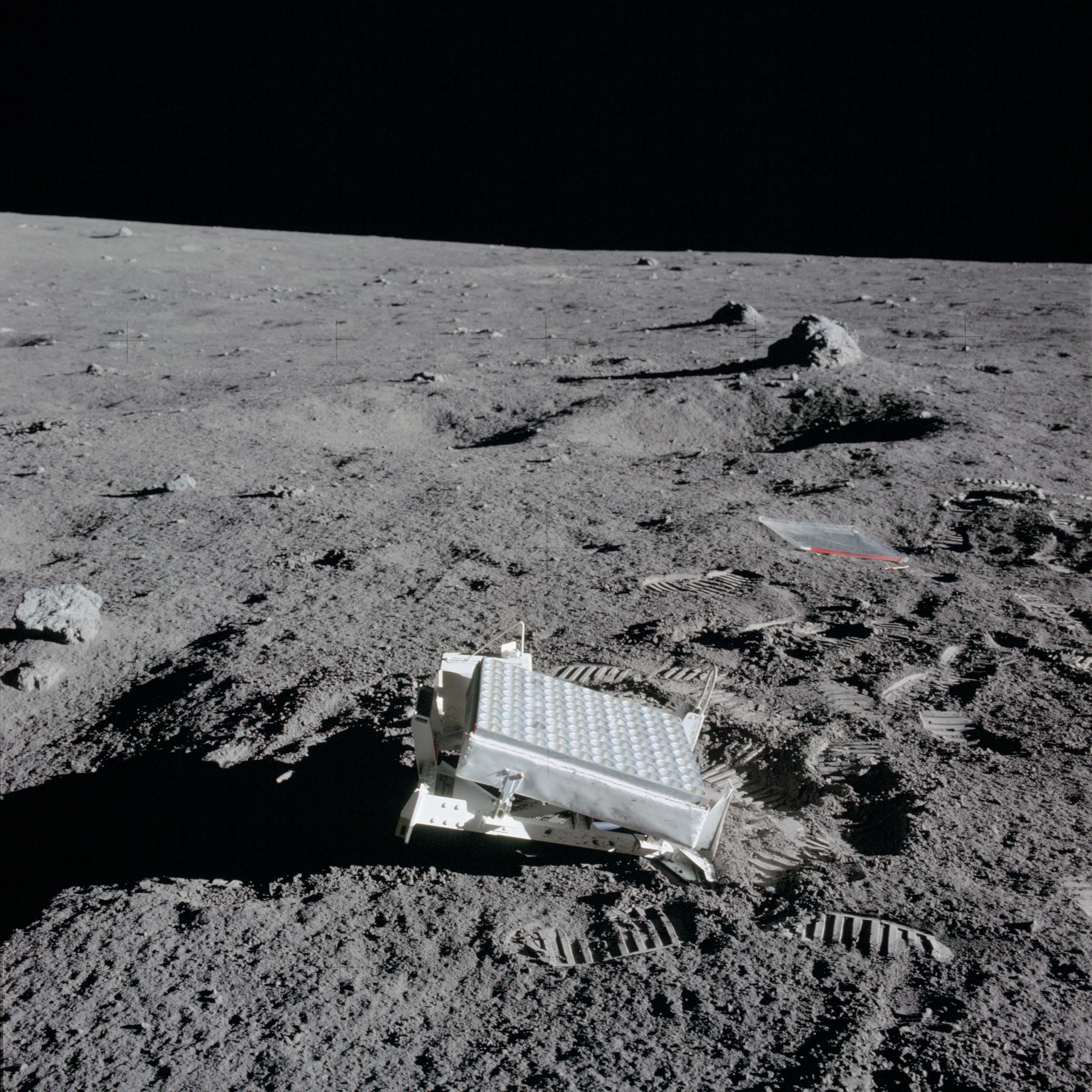
AS14-67-9386: Retroflector left on the Moon by Apollo 14

Quoting from James Hansen's 2005 biography of Neil Armstrong, First Man: The Life of Neil A. Armstrong:

For those few misguided souls who still cling to the belief that the Moon landings never happened, examination of the results of five decades of LRRR experiments should evidence how delusional their rejection of the Moon landing really is.

The NASA-independent Observatoire de la Côte d'Azur, McDonald, Apache Point, and Haleakalā observatories regularly use the Apollo LRRR. Lick Observatory attempted to detect from Apollo 11's retroreflector while Armstrong and Aldrin were still on the Moon but did not succeed until August 1, 1969. The Apollo 14 astronauts deployed a retroreflector on February 5, 1971, and McDonald Observatory detected it the same day. The Apollo 15 retroreflector was deployed on July 31, 1971, and was detected by McDonald Observatory within a few days.

The image on the left shows what is considered some of the most unambiguous evidence. This experiment repeatedly fires a laser at the Moon, at the spots where the Apollo landings were reported. The dots show when photons are received from the Moon. The dark line shows that a large number come back at a specific time, and hence were reflected by something quite small (well under a metre in size). Photons reflected from the surface come back over a much broader range of times (the whole vertical range of the plot corresponds to only 18 metres or so in range). The concentration of photons at a specific time appears when the laser is aimed at the Apollos 11, 14 or 15 landing sites; otherwise the expected featureless distribution is observed. The Apollo reflectors are still in use.

Strictly speaking, although retroreflectors left by Apollo astronauts are strong evidence that human-manufactured artifacts currently exist on the Moon and that human visitors left them there, they are not, on their own, conclusive evidence. Uncrewed missions are known to have placed such objects on the Moon, albeit not before 1970. Smaller retroreflectors were carried by the uncrewed landers Lunokhod 1 and Lunokhod 2 in 1970 and 1973, respectively. The location of Lunokhod 1 was unknown for nearly 40 years but it was rediscovered in 2010 in photographs by the Lunar Reconnaissance Orbiter (LRO) and its retroreflector is now in use. Both the United States and the USSR had the capability to soft-land objects on the surface of the Moon for several years before that. The USSR successfully landed its first uncrewed probe (Luna 9) on the Moon in February 1966, and the United States followed with Surveyor 1 in June 1966, but no uncrewed landers carried retroreflectors before Lunokhod 1 in November 1970. The retroreflectors are proof that human-made probes reached the exact locations of the Apollo 11, 14, and 15 landing sites at exactly the same time as those missions.

=== Radio-telescopic observations ===
In October–November 1977, the Soviet radio telescope RATAN-600 observed all five transmitters of ALSEP scientific packages placed on the Moon surface by all Apollo landing missions excluding Apollo 11. Their selenographic coordinates and the transmitter power outputs (20 W) were in agreement with the NASA reports.

=== Photographs ===
==== Ground-based telescopes ====
In 2002, astronomers tested the optics of the Very Large Telescope by imaging the Apollo landing sites. The telescope was used to image the Moon and provided a resolution of 130 meters (430 ft), which was not good enough to resolve the 4.2 meters (14 ft) wide lunar landers or their long shadows.

==== New lunar missions ====
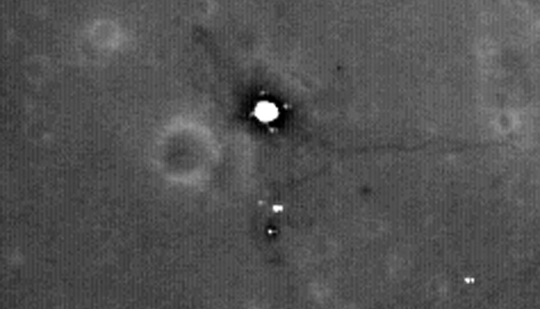
Apollo 11 landing site photographed by LRO

Post-Apollo lunar exploration missions have located and imaged artifacts of the Apollo program remaining on the Moon's surface.

Images taken by the Lunar Reconnaissance Orbiter mission beginning in July 2009 show the six Apollo Lunar Module descent stages, Apollo Lunar Surface Experiments Package (ALSEP) science experiments, astronaut footpaths, and the Lunar Roving Vehicle's tire tracks. These images are the most effective proof to date to rebut the "landing hoax" theories. Although this probe was indeed launched by NASA, the camera and the interpretation of the images are under the control of an academic group — the LROC Science Operations Center at Arizona State University, along with many other academic groups. At least some of these groups, such as German Aerospace Center, Berlin, are not located in the US, and are not funded by the US government.

After the images shown here were taken, the LRO mission moved into a lower orbit for higher resolution camera work. All of the sites have since been re-imaged at higher resolution. Comparison of the original 16 mm Apollo 17 LM camera footage during ascent to the 2011 LRO photos of the landing site show an almost exact match of the rover tracks.

Further imaging in 2012 shows the shadows cast by the flags planted by the astronauts on all Apollo landing sites. The exception is that of Apollo 11, which matches Buzz Aldrin's account of the flag being blown over by the lander's rocket exhaust on leaving the Moon.

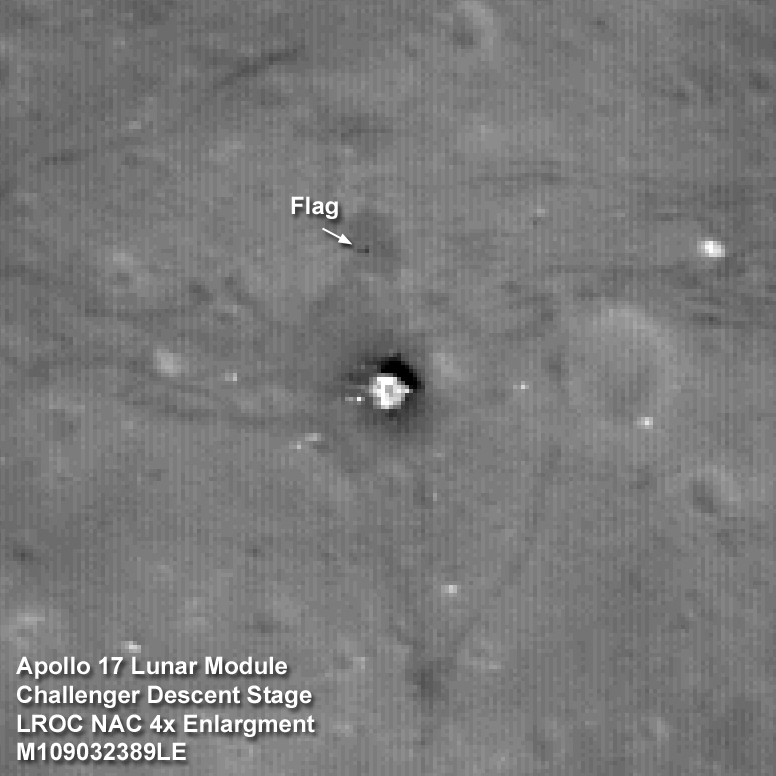
Higher resolution image of the Apollo 17 landing site showing the Lunar Module Challenger descent stage as photographed by the LRO

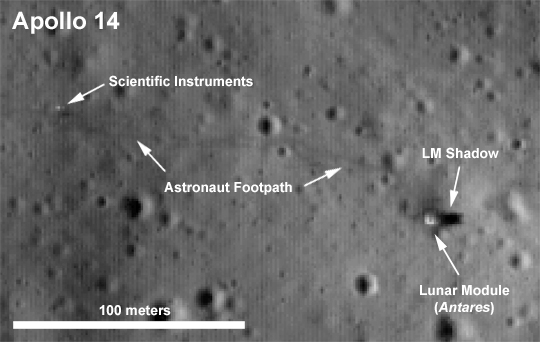
Apollo 14 landing site, photograph by LRO

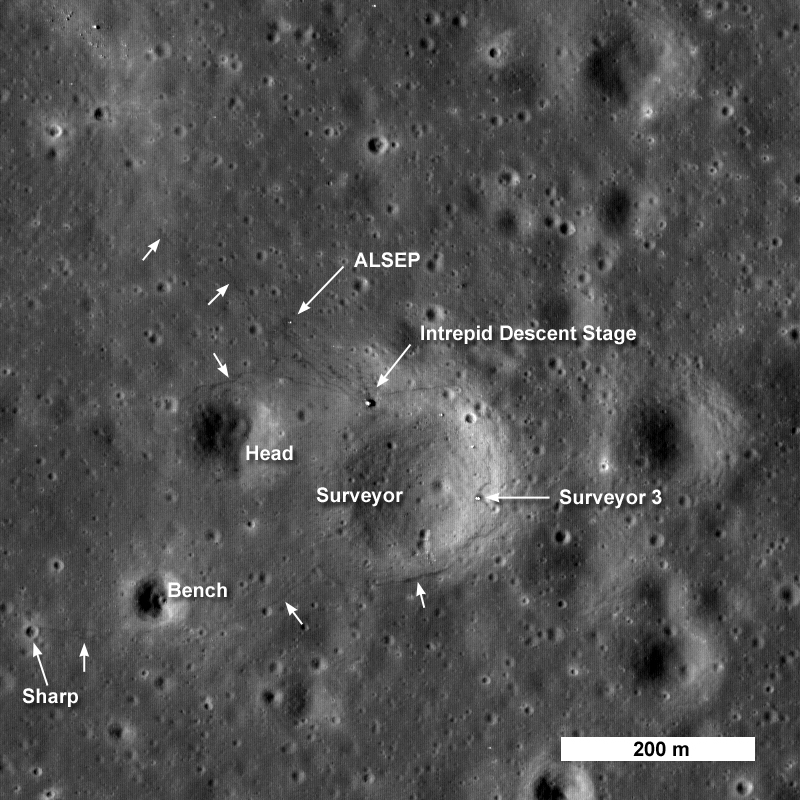
Apollo 12 landing site

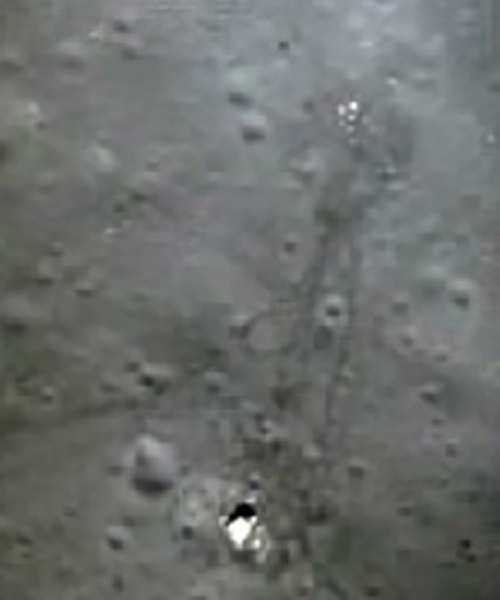
Apollo 15 landing site (by LRO)

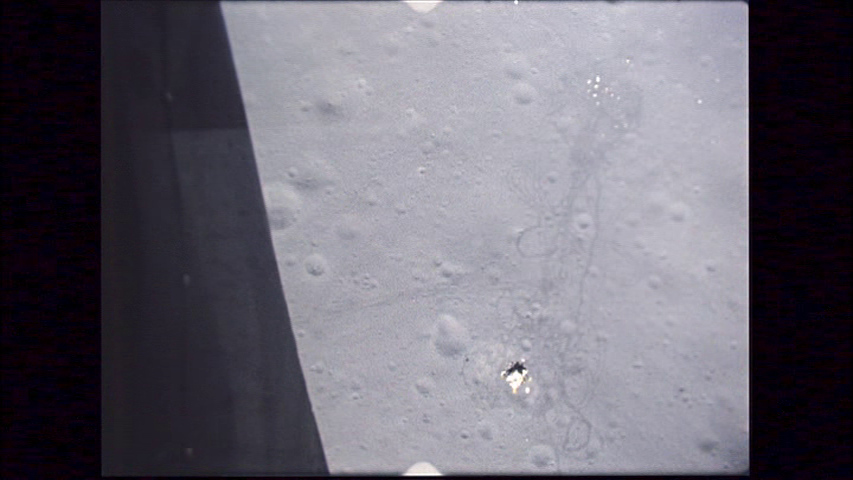
Apollo 15 landing site (from Lunar Module film)

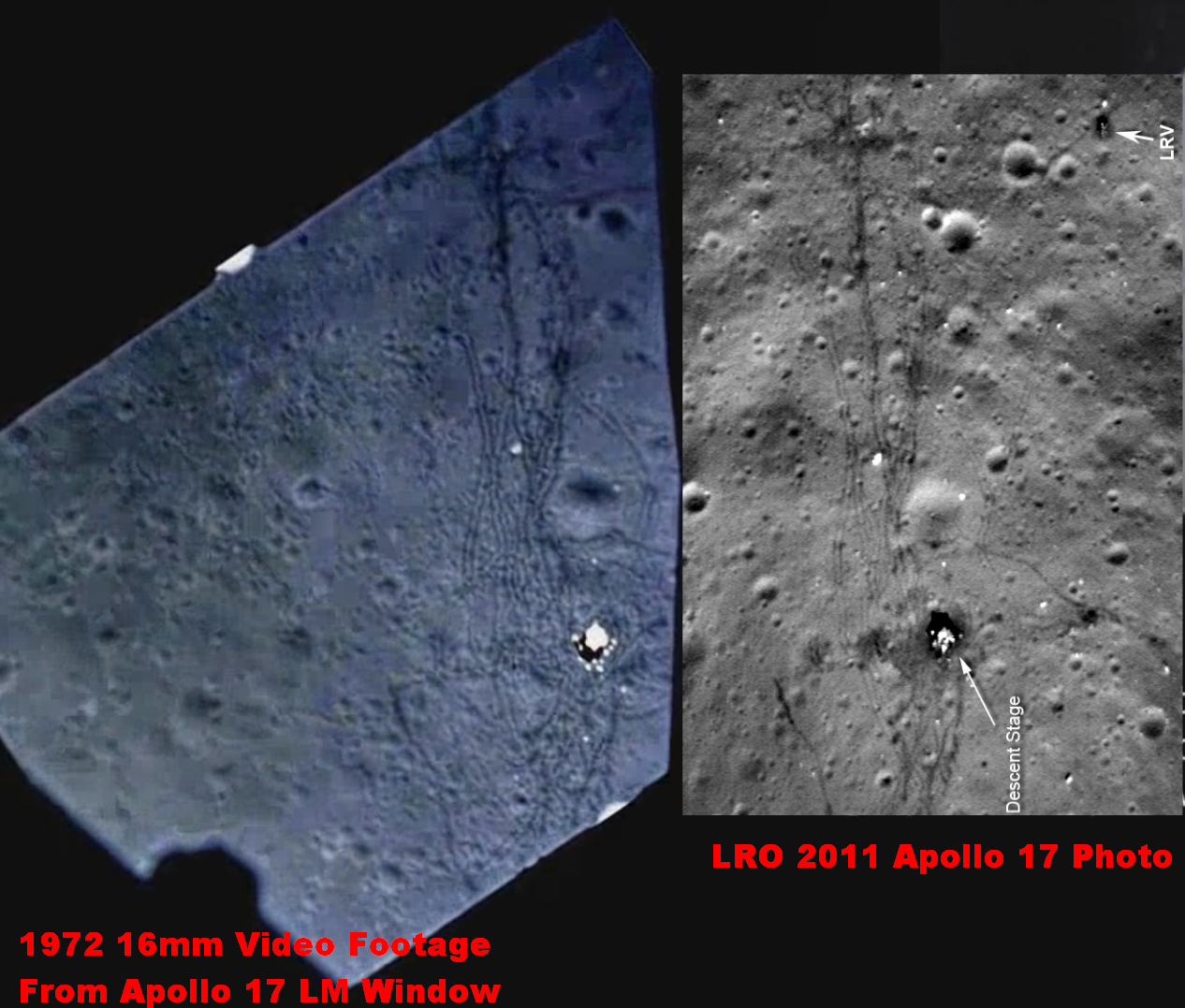
Comparison of the Apollo 17 landing site between the original 16 mm footage shot from the LM window during ascent in 1972, and the 2011 lunar reconnaissance orbiter image of the Apollo 17 landing site. From the EEVdiscover video.

==== Ultraviolet photographs ====
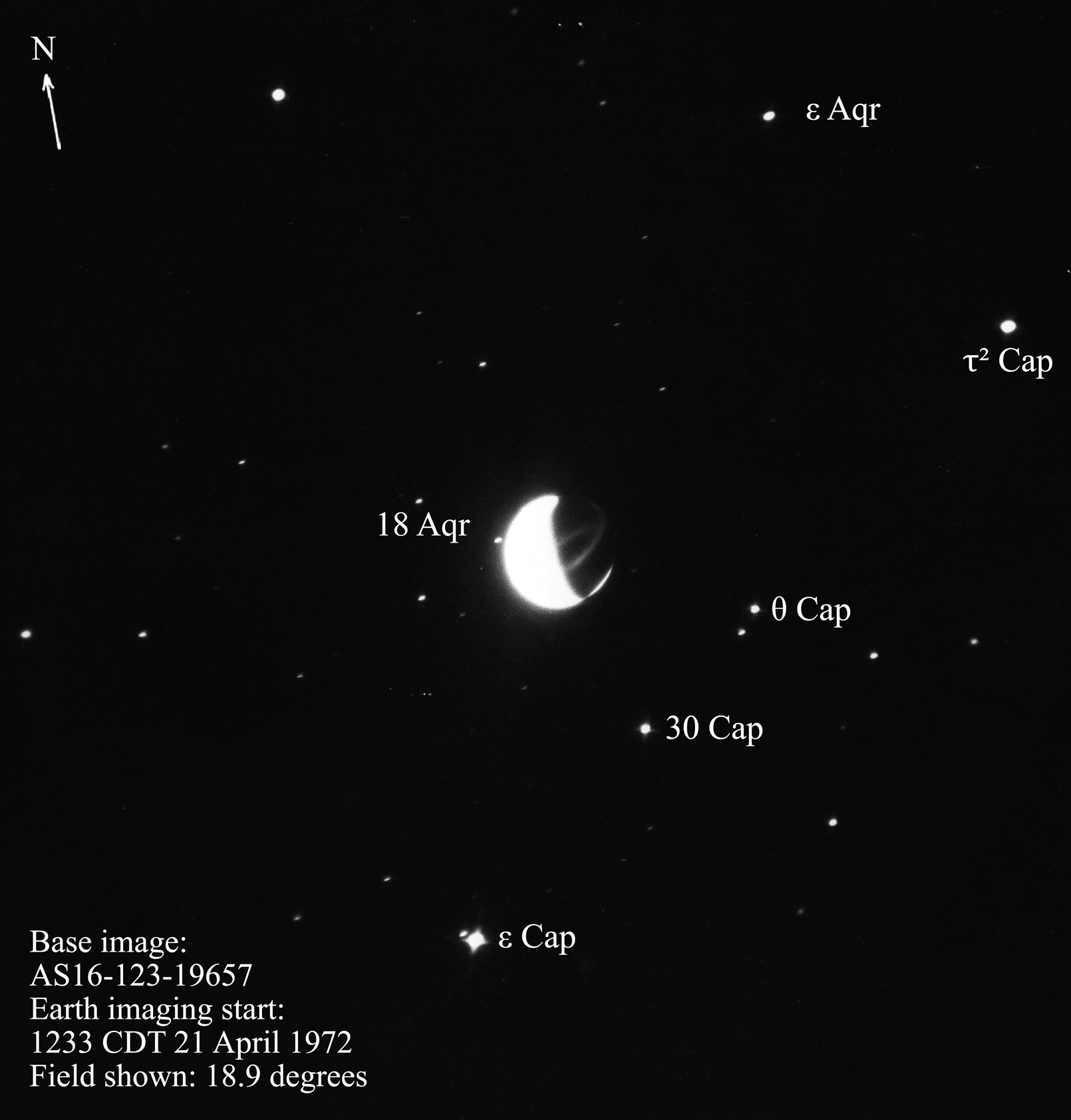
AS16-123-19657: Long-exposure photograph taken from the surface of the Moon by Apollo 16 using the Far Ultraviolet Camera/Spectrograph. It shows the Earth with the correct background of stars (some labeled)

Long-exposure photos were taken with the Far Ultraviolet Camera/Spectrograph by Apollo 16 on April 21, 1972, from the surface of the Moon. Some of these photos show the Earth with stars from the constellations Capricornus and Aquarius in the background. The European Space Research Organisation's TD-1A satellite later scanned the sky for stars that are bright in ultraviolet light. The TD-1A data obtained with the shortest passband is a close match for the Apollo 16 photographs.

=== Apollo missions tracked by non-NASA personnel ===
This section contains reports of the lunar missions from facilities that had significant numbers of non-NASA employees. This includes facilities such as the Deep Space Network, which employed (and still employs) many local citizens in Spain and Australia, and facilities such as the Parkes Observatory, which were hired by NASA for specific tasks, but staffed by non-NASA personnel.

==== Observers of all missions ====
The NASA Manned Space Flight Network (MSFN) was a worldwide network of stations that tracked the Mercury, Gemini, Apollo and Skylab missions. Most MSFN stations were only needed during the launch, Earth orbit and landing phases of the lunar missions, but three "deep space" sites with larger antennas provided continuous coverage during the trans-lunar, trans-Earth and lunar mission phases. Today, these three sites form the NASA Deep Space Network: the Goldstone Deep Space Communications Complex near Goldstone, California; the Madrid Deep Space Communication Complex near Madrid, Spain; and the Canberra Deep Space Communication Complex, adjacent to the Tidbinbilla Nature Reserve, near Canberra, Australia.

Although most MSFN stations were NASA-owned, they employed many local citizens. NASA also contracted the Parkes Observatory in New South Wales, Australia, to supplement the three deep space sites, most famously during the Apollo 11 moonwalk as documented by radio astronomer John Sarkissian and portrayed (humorously and not quite accurately) in the 2000 film The Dish. The Parkes Observatory is not NASA-owned; it is, and always has been, owned and operated by the Commonwealth Scientific and Industrial Research Organisation (CSIRO), a research agency of the Australian government. It would have been relatively easy for NASA to avoid using the Parkes Observatory to receive the Apollo 11 lunar surface television signals by scheduling the moonwalk at an earlier time when the Goldstone station could provide complete coverage.

==== Apollo 11 ====
- The Madrid Apollo Station, now part of the Deep Space Network, built in Fresnedillas, near Madrid, Spain, tracked Apollo 11. A large majority of the people working at this station were not employees of NASA, but of Spain's Instituto Nacional de Técnica Aeroespacial.

==== Apollo 12 ====
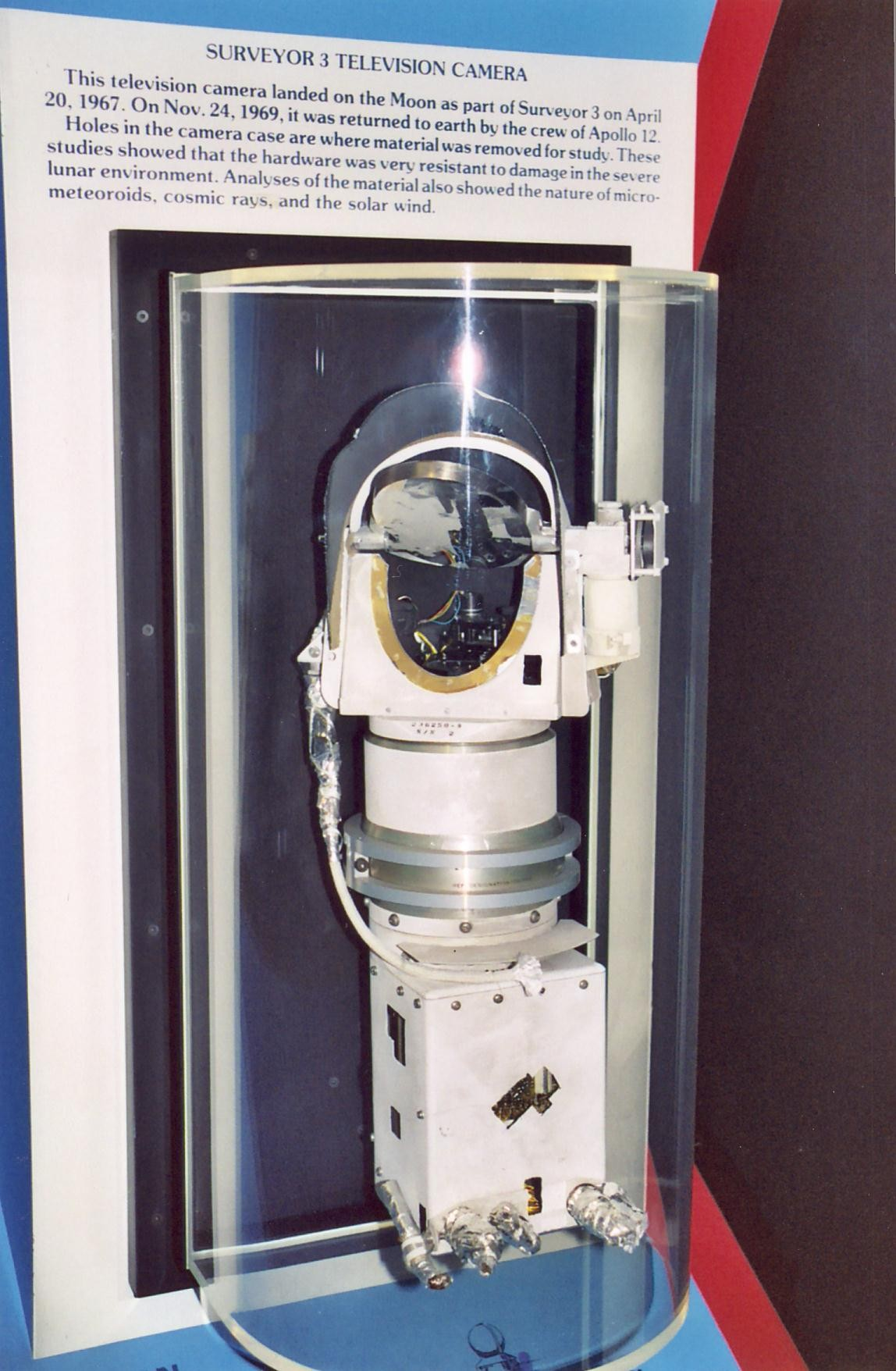
Surveyor 3 camera brought back from the Moon by Apollo 12, on display at the National Air and Space Museum

Parts of Surveyor 3, which landed on the Moon in April 1967, were brought back to Earth by Apollo 12 in November 1969. These samples were shown to have been exposed to lunar conditions.

== See also ==
- Apollo program
- Examination of Apollo Moon photographs
- Moon landing
- Moon rock
