= William Karel =

French film director and author (born 1940)

William Karel (born 1940) is a French film director and author. He is known for his historical and political documentaries.

== Biography ==
Karel was born in Bizerte in French Tunisia. After studying in Paris, he emigrated to Israel where he lived for about 10 years in a kibbutz. Returning to France in 1981, he turned to photography and worked for more than ten years as a photo-reporter for several agencies like Gamma (1972–1976) and Sygma (1976–1983). Then he started to direct movies.

Since the end of the eighties, Karel has directed many historical and political documentaries dealing with sensitive subjects of the twentieth century, from the Vel' d'Hiv Roundup (Rafle du Vélodrome d'Hiver) to the Israeli-Arab conflict, while talking about the FMI policy in Jamaica or the extreme right wing in France. His documentaries are frequently broadcast by the state controlled Arte and France 3 channels. He has also done portraits of French and American politicians – Valéry Giscard d'Estaing, François Mitterrand, Jean-Marie Le Pen, John F. Kennedy and George W. Bush.

Studies of the United States are an important part of Karel's work. After The Men of the White House (2000), a film about presidents during periods of crisis, he explored the secrets of the CIA in CIA, Secret Wars (2003). This movie is based primarily on interviews of former CIA directors, former CIA agents such as Robert Baer, and historians. Inspired by Eric Laurent's books about George W. Bush, he released The World According to Bush (2004) which quickly became famous in France through television and theatres.

Refusing to stick to a single genre, he also directed the mockumentary Dark Side of the Moon (2002). In The Empire State Building murders (2008), he combines clips from film noir and recent interviews with actors to tell a narrative story. He likes to recall François Truffaut's words, "A documentary is one thousand times more of a lie than a fiction, where things are clear from the beginning".

In 2011, William directed a film about a publisher Gallimard and its 100 greatest authors. Among them, William chose to include Philip Roth as one of the great American novelists, along with Hemingway, Fitzgerald, Styron, Salinger, Faulkner, Steinbeck and Miller.

== Published work ==
=== Filmography ===
- 1988 : De Gaulle? Connais pas, Envoyé spécial, France 2.
- 1989 : L'Argentine dans la crise, Envoyé spécial, France 2.
- 1989 : Les juifs du bout du monde, Envoyé spécial, France 2.
- 1992 : La Rafle du Vel' d'Hiv, La Marche du siècle, France 3.
- 1992 : Les deux morts de Joseph Staline, Planète chaude, France 3.
- 1993 : La Guerre du Kippour, Les Brûlures de l'Histoire, France 3.
- 1993 : Sartre-Aron : 50 ans d'histoires, Les Brûlures de l'Histoire, France 3.
- 1993 : John F. Kennedy, Les Brûlures de l'Histoire, France 3.
- 1994 : Le FMI en Jamaïque, Grand Format, Arte.
- 1994 : La Nuit des Longs Couteaux, Les Brûlures de l'Histoire, France 3.
- 1995 : Une journée particulière : le 8 mai 1945, Les Brûlures de l'Histoire, France 3.
- 1995 : Albert Cohen, Un siècle d'écrivains, France 3.
- 1995 : Contre l'oubli (co-réalisation avec Blanche Finger), Documents, France 2.
- 1996 : Primo Levi, Un Siècle d'écrivains, France 3.
- 1996 : Mourir à Verdun, Les Dossiers de l'Histoire, France 3.
- 1996 : La Cagoule, Les Dossiers de l'Histoire, France 3.
- 1997 : Une terre deux fois promise : Israël-Palestine, Les Dossiers de l'Histoire, France 3.
- 1999 : Histoire d'une droite extrême, Les Mercredis de l'Histoire, Arte.
- 1999 : Le Journal commence à vingt heures, La Vie en face, Arte.
- 2000 : Les Hommes de la Maison Blanche, Les Mercredis de l'Histoire, Arte.
- 2001 : Conversation avec les hommes du Président, Histoire.
- 2001 : François Mitterrand. Un mensonge d'Etat passé sous silence, France 3.
- 2002 : Valéry Giscard d'Estaing, le théâtre du pouvoir, Les Dossiers de l'Histoire, France 3.
- 2002 : Opération Lune or Dark Side of the Moon, Les Mercredis de l'Histoire, Arte.
- 2003 : CIA, Guerres secrètes – 1947–1977, Opérations clandestines, Les Mercredis de l'Histoire, Arte.
- 2003 : CIA, Guerres secrètes – 1977–1989, La fin des illusions, Les Mercredis de l'Histoire, Arte.
- 2003 : CIA, Guerres secrètes – 1989–2003, D'une guerre à l'autre, Les Mercredis de l'Histoire, Arte.
- 2004 : The World According to Bush
- 2005 : La Fille du Juge.
- 2008 : Meurtres à l'Empire State Building
- 2009 : Mais qui a tué Maggie?
- 2009 : 1929, about 1929 crisis.
- 2010 : Gallimard, le Roi Lire, Arte.
- 2011 : Album, Arte.
- 2011 : Philippe Roth, sans complexe, Arte.
- 2011 : Looking for Nicolas Sarkozy, Arte.

=== List of books ===
- Karel, William and Laurent Rucker, Israël-Palestine, une terre deux fois promise, Le Rocher, Paris, 1998.
