= Fly Me to the Moon (2024 film) =

Film by Greg Berlanti

- Theatrical release poster
- Directed by: Greg Berlanti
- Screenplay by: Rose Gilroy
- Based on: Story by: Bill Kirstein; Keenan Flynn
- Produced by: Jonathan Lia; Scarlett Johansson; Keenan Flynn; Sarah Schechter
- Starring: Scarlett Johansson; Channing Tatum; Jim Rash; Anna Garcia; Donald Elise Watkins; Noah Robbins; Colin Woodell; Christian Zuber; Nick Dillenburg; Ray Romano; Woody Harrelson
- Cinematography: Dariusz Wolski
- Edited by: Harry Jierjian
- Music by: Daniel Pemberton
- Production companies: Columbia Pictures; Apple Studios; These Pictures
- Distributed by: Sony Pictures Releasing; Apple Original Films (Note: Split distribution between Sony Pictures Releasing and Apple TV+; Sony handled the theatrical and VOD release, while Apple handled the SVOD release.)
- Release dates: July 8, 2024 (AMC Lincoln Square); July 12, 2024 (United States)
- Running time: 132 minutes
- Country: United States
- Language: English
- Budget: $100 million
- Box office: $42 million

Fly Me to the Moon is a 2024 American historical romantic comedy drama film directed by Greg Berlanti from a screenplay by Rose Gilroy, based on a story by Bill Kirstein and Keenan Flynn. The film stars Scarlett Johansson as Kelly Jones, a marketing specialist, and Channing Tatum as Cole Davis, a NASA launch director. Set against the backdrop of the Apollo 11 mission, the story follows Jones and Davis as she is tasked with creating a false moon landing in case his actual mission fails.

Fly Me to the Moon premiered on July 8, 2024, at AMC Lincoln Square in New York City, New York, and was released in theaters on July 12. Originally planned for a streaming release on Apple TV+, it was moved to a theatrical release after positive early test screenings. The film received generally positive reviews from critics. It grossed $42 million worldwide on a production budget of $100 million.

== Plot ==
In late 1968, Manhattan advertising executive Kelly Jones is offered a high-stakes job by Moe Berkus, a covert government operative working for President-elect Richard Nixon. He tasks her with revitalizing NASA's public image amidst waning interest in the Space Race. Under threat of being exposed for her deceptive past, Kelly reluctantly agrees and moves to Cocoa Beach, Florida, with her loyal assistant, Ruby.

Upon arriving, Kelly encounters Cole Davis, the serious and principled launch director at the Kennedy Space Center. They immediately clash over Kelly's unconventional methods to boost NASA's public appeal, including corporate sponsorships and hiring actors to portray scientists. Despite their differences, they begin to develop a mutual respect and attraction.

As NASA prepares for the historic Apollo 11 mission, Kelly suggests broadcasting the moon landing using a television camera on the Lunar Excursion Module (LEM), a proposal Cole dismisses as impractical. However, Moe secretly endorses the idea and reveals an additional, shadowy directive to Kelly: she must prepare a fake moon landing to be aired if the real mission fails, a project codenamed "Artemis".

Moe pressures Kelly into creating this ruse by threatening to expose her fraudulent past, as she has skillfully reinvented herself. She arranges for a very talented but virtually unknown director to come on board. The set is then created in a heavily guarded, isolated hangar. All involved are sworn to secrecy.

Kelly becomes increasingly uneasy with the deception, especially as she and Cole grow closer. When a key congressional supporter withdraws, jeopardizing NASA's funding, Cole and Kelly team up to win back his vote, ultimately succeeding through Cole's heartfelt appeal to a skeptical senator.

Their partnership blossoms into a romantic relationship. As the Apollo 11 launch nears, Kelly discovers that the fake broadcast is set to air, regardless of the mission's outcome, due to sabotage of the LEM camera. Overcome with guilt, she confesses everything to Cole, and together, they manage to repair the camera just in time.

During the live broadcast, it is unclear whether audiences are watching the real moon landing or the fake one. A stray cat wandering onto the set confirms NASA is broadcasting live video from the moon and the mission is celebrated as a success.

In the end, Moe begrudgingly accepts that the truth prevailed, allowing Kelly to leave her dark past behind. She reveals her real name, Winnie, to Cole, and they rekindle their romance as the Apollo 11 astronauts safely return to Earth.

== Cast ==
- Scarlett Johansson as Kelly Jones
- Channing Tatum as Cole Davis
- Woody Harrelson as Moe Berkus
- Ray Romano as Henry Smalls
- Jim Rash as Lance Vespertine
- Anna Garcia as Ruby Martin
- Donald Elise Watkins as Stu Bryce
- Noah Robbins as Don Harper
- Christian Clemenson as Walter
- Colin Woodell as Buzz Aldrin
- Nick Dillenburg as Neil Armstrong
- Christian Zuber as Michael Collins
- Gene Jones as Senator Hopp
- Joe Chrest as Senator Vanning
- Stephanie Kurtzuba as Jolene Vanning
- Colin Jost as Senator Cook
- Dariusz Wolski as Edvardo
- Peter Jacobson as Chuck Meadows
- Victor Garber as Senator Hedges (uncredited)

== Production ==
In March 2022, Apple Studios announced it had acquired the rights to produce a film set in the backdrop of the Space Race, then titled Project Artemis, for more than $100 million. Scarlett Johansson and Chris Evans were also announced as starring in the film, with Jason Bateman directing. In May, Bateman said the working title Project Artemis was likely to change. He left the project the following month, citing creative differences, and was later replaced by Greg Berlanti, his first directorial effort since 2018's Love, Simon.

Screenwriter Rose Gilroy referred to the book Marketing the Moon for her writing. She said the book "is about the original ads that were used, and how sci-fi was woven into the minds of the American people" using genre books and films. "That was instrumental… It was endlessly interesting to learn all the ways they sold" the Apollo 11 mission. While Gilroy received sole credit for the screenplay, Bill Kirstein and Keenan Flynn credited with a "based on" credit for the story, Dana Fox and Michael Green also made contributions to the script, earning "additional literary material" credit.

The search for a new director and Berlanti's availability changed the production schedule, forcing Evans to drop out as well. In July, Channing Tatum entered into negotiations to replace him. In September, Jim Rash joined the cast. Ray Romano, Anna Garcia, and Woody Harrelson would be added in the following months.

Principal photography began in Atlanta on October 27, 2022, with a casting call issued seeking extras to play NASA employees and FBI agents. By December 21, 2023, with a release date of July 12, 2024 set, the film was no longer titled Project Artemis. In April 2024, the film's new title was revealed to be Fly Me to the Moon, and Daniel Pemberton was confirmed to compose the score.

== Release ==
The film was initially slated to be released direct-to-streaming on Apple TV+ but was redirected to theatrical following strong test screenings. Following their partnership on Napoleon, Apple entered into another agreement with Sony Pictures to distribute the film in cinemas in December 2023, after both Warner Bros. and Paramount declined to bid for theatrical distribution rights with the latter saying it already had full release schedules. Sony Pictures scheduled the film for a theatrical release in the United States and Canada on July 12, 2024, following its premiere at AMC Lincoln Square in New York City on July 8, 2024.

The film was released on premium video on demand (PVOD) on August 14, 2024. It was released on Apple TV+ on December 6, 2024.

== Reception ==
=== Box office ===
Fly Me to the Moon grossed $20.5 million in the United States and Canada, and $21.7 million in other territories, for a worldwide total of $42.2 million.

In the United States and Canada, Fly Me to the Moon was released alongside Longlegs, and was projected to gross around $12 million from 3,356 theaters in its opening weekend. It made $4.5 million on its first day, including $875,000 from Thursday night previews. It went on to debut at $9.4 million, finishing fifth. In its second weekend, the film made $3.3 million, finishing sixth.

=== Critical response ===
On the review aggregator website Rotten Tomatoes, 66% of 238 critics' reviews are positive, with an average rating of 6.1/10. The website's consensus reads: "Sustained by Scarlett Johansson and Channing Tatum's screwball chemistry even when its plotting strains credulity, this throwback romance is a pleasant enough trip to the moon and back." Metacritic, which uses a weighted average, assigned the film a score of 53 out of 100, based on 49 critics, indicating "mixed or average" reviews. Audiences polled by CinemaScore gave the film an average grade of "A–" on an A+ to F scale, while those polled by PostTrak gave it an 86% overall positive score.

Glenn Kenny of The New York Times gave the movie a mixed review. He praised the chemistry between Johansson and Tatum, writing that "the movie lives and dies with its lead actors". Kenny also criticized the plot as "convoluted" and "belabored", especially in the latter parts of the film. In a negative review, Richard Brody of The New Yorker described the movie as a "comedic contrivance" that failed to communicate anything meaningful about the time or events portrayed. Peter Bradshaw of The Guardian also disliked the film, awarding it two out of five stars and calling it a "misjudged and unfunny romcom".

=== Accolades ===
Award	Date of ceremony	Category	Recipient(s)	Result	Ref.
Golden Trailer Awards	May 30, 2024	Best Comedy	"Connection"	Nominated	
Golden Trailer Awards	May 30, 2024	Best Romance	"Connection"	Nominated	
Saturn Awards	February 2, 2025	Best Action / Adventure Film	Fly Me to the Moon	Nominated	

== See also ==
- Apollo 11 in popular culture
- Moon landing conspiracy theories in popular culture
