= Empire State Building Murders =

- French: Meurtres à l'Empire State Building
- Directed by: William Karel
- Written by: Jerome Charyn; William Karel
- Produced by: Bernard Tibi; Dominique Tibi
- Cinematography: Ned Burgess
- Edited by: Stéphanie Mahet
- Music by: Carolin Petit
- Production companies: Arte; BeTV; Canal+; Centre National de la Cinématographie; Procirep; Roche Productions; Special Broadcasting Service; Yleisradio
- Release date: August 14, 2008 (USA)
- Running time: 88 min

Empire State Building Murders (French: Meurtres à l'Empire State Building) is a 2008 French mockumentary film directed by William Karel and starring Ben Gazzara, Mickey Rooney, Kirk Douglas, Cyd Charisse, Richard Erdman, Anne Jeffreys, and Marsha Hunt. It is considered a spin of Dead Men Don't Wear Plaid (1982). The film is also Kirk Douglas’ last television appearance before his retirement and subsequent death.

== Plot ==
Set within a fictional investigation, the film opens in 2007 when an old undelivered letter, written in 1949, is discovered in a New York post office. The letter was sent by Penny Baxter, a young woman trapped in a dangerous marriage to a notorious gangster, and warns that her life is in imminent danger. Its discovery prompts an elderly former detective, Jim Kovalski, to revisit a long-buried series of murders connected to organised crime around the Empire State Building.

As Kovalski recounts the case, the story reconstructs New York in the 1930s and 1940s, unfolding amid Prohibition, gang warfare, corruption and doomed romance. Penny’s murder, along with the killing of a 13-year-old witness, reveals a web of betrayal involving mobsters, nightclub figures and police informants. The investigation gradually exposes the tragic consequences of ambition, love and loyalty in the criminal underworld.

The film is notable for its unusual form: rather than using newly shot period scenes, Karel creates the entire drama from re-edited excerpts of classic American film noir and gangster films from the 1930s to the 1950s, seamlessly combined with staged contemporary interviews featuring surviving Hollywood actors such as Kirk Douglas, Mickey Rooney, and Cyd Charisse. The result is both a fictional murder mystery and a cinematic homage to American film noir, celebrating the icons of Hollywood’s golden age while playfully reworking the visual codes, dialogue and atmosphere of the genre.

== Cast ==
- Ben Gazzara as Paulie Genovese
- Mickey Rooney as Mickey Silver
- Kirk Douglas as Jim Kovalski
- Cyd Charisse as Vicky Adams
- Richard Erdman as Eddie Walker
- Anne Jeffreys as Betty Clark
- Marsha Hunt as Norah Strinberg
- Sara Sumara as Penny Baxter
- Patrick Floersheim as Récitant / Narrator
- Lauren Bacall as Penny Baxter (archive footage)
- James Cagney as Tony (archive footage)
- Wolfgang Draeger as Narrator
- Van Heflin as Bobby (archive footage)
- Edward G. Robinson as Brassi (archive footage)
- Lizabeth Scott as Lisa (archive footage)
- Simone Simon as Audrey (archive footage)
- Lawrence Tierney as Rico (archive footage)
- Richard Widmark as Stan (archive footage)
