= The World According to Bush =

2004 documentary film

- Directed by: William Karel
- Release date: 2004
- Country: France

The World According to Bush (French: Le Monde Selon Bush) is a 2004 French documentary, co-written and directed by William Karel based on the book by Éric Laurent, about the presidency of George W. Bush and the history of the Bush family, including his grandfather Prescott Bush, who was on the board of German-owned companies during the Nazi period. The film examines and interviews Bush supporters, including the Christian right, neo-conservatives, and businesspeople, as well as Bush critics and shows televised statements made by Bush and his supporters, including Jerry Falwell. It was nominated for the Best Documentary Award at the European Film Awards and was to have been an Official Selection for the 2004 Cannes Film Festival but was rejected following the selection of Michael Moore's Fahrenheit 9/11.

The film features interviews with (in order of appearance):

- Michael Ledeen
- David Frum
- Jim Hoagland, Washington Post
- Stanley Hoffmann, Harvard University
- Jerry Falwell
- James Robison
- Ed McAteer
- Arnaud de Borchgrave, Washington Post
- Robert David Steele, Central Intelligence Agency
- James Woolsey
- Richard Perle
- Robert Baer, Central Intelligence Agency
- Antony Blinken
- David Corn, The Nation
- Hans Blix
- Sam Gwynne, Texas Monthly
- Colin Powell
- Joseph Wilson
- Charles Lewis (journalist), Center for Public Integrity
- Viet Dinh
- Norman Mailer
- Frank Carlucci, Carlyle Group
- Laurent Murawiec, former analyst at Rand Corporation
- David Kay
