= Looking for Nicolas Sarkozy =

- Directed by: William Karel
- Produced by: ROCHE Productions et ARTE France
- Release date: 21 December 2011
- Country: France
- Language: French

Looking for Nicolas Sarkozy is a 2011 French documentary film directed by William Karel. The film records the reactions of 18 non-French Paris-based journalists when Karel asked their opinions of Nicolas Sarkozy, the 23rd President of France. It was released on TV network Arte on 21 December 2011, and pitched at the 2011 MeetMarket as part of Sheffield Doc/Fest.
