= Dark Side of the Moon (2002 film) =

2002 French mockumentary by director William Karel

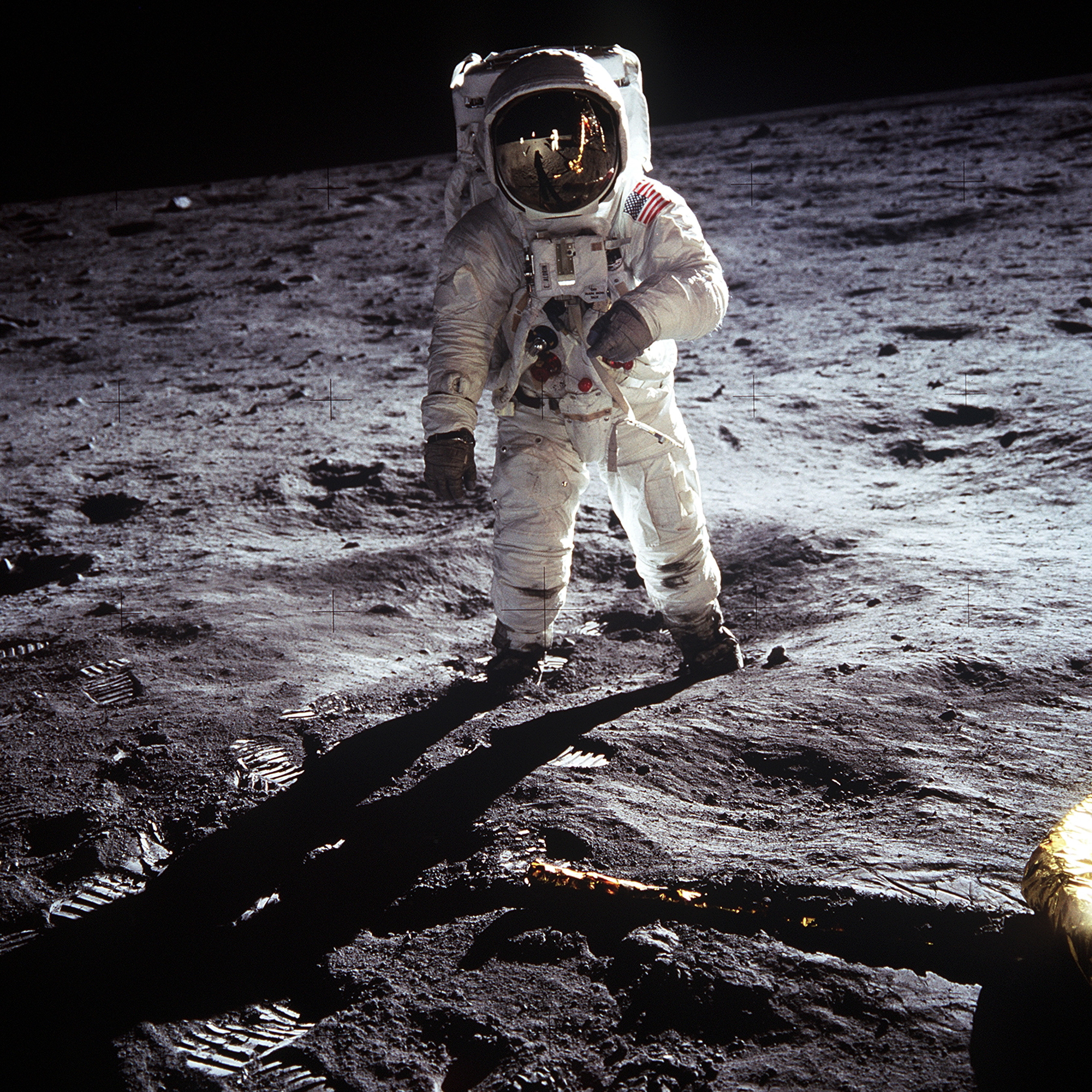
- Picture of Buzz Aldrin on the Moon, used for the DVD cover
- French: Opération Lune
- Genre: Mockumentary
- Directed by: William Karel
- Narrated by: Philippe Faure (French) / Andrew Solomon (English)
- Country of origin: France
- Original language: French / English

Production
- Executive producer: Luc Martin-Gousset
- Producers: Vincent Décis, Emmanuelle Fage, Jean-Paul Llamazares
- Cinematography: Stéphane Saporito, A.S.C.
- Editor: Tal Zana
- Running time: 52 minutes
- Production company: Arte France / Point du Jour

Original release
- Network: Arte
- Release: 16 October 2002

Dark Side of the Moon is a French mockumentary by director William Karel. It originally aired on the Franco-German television network Arte in 2002 with the title Opération Lune.

The mockumentary's basic premise is that the television footage from the Apollo 11 Moon landing was faked and recorded in a studio by the CIA with help from director Stanley Kubrick.

== Plot ==
The mockumentary begins with the premise that NASA loaned a unique and secret lens to Kubrick for the purpose of creating a faked Moon landing in a studio. In reality, the Carl Zeiss Planar 50mm f/0.7 lens was designed by Zeiss in 1966 on special request for NASA for the Apollo program, and a batch of ten were made. Kubrick bought three left over lenses from this batch for the filming of Barry Lyndon and had them extensively modified to make them usable on his 35 mm camera.

The first part tells of the inception of the NASA's lunar program, emphasizing the issues related to its funding and the necessary public support to the program. NASA regards Stanley Kubrick's 2001: A Space Odyssey as the prototype of the show that the space program needs to be in order to gain this support, leading them to design the spacesuits and vessels in a "Hollywood" fashion and even to hire 700 Hollywood technicians, making all of Hollywood stop working on other projects. But the outcome of Apollo 11 is disappointing: although the landing is successful, Neil Armstrong makes a fool of himself and not a single shot of the moonwalk is usable.

The incapability of shooting images on the Moon had been anticipated by Richard Nixon and his staff who decided to fake the pictures on the Moon, using the set of 2001 that was still available in London. Kubrick had refused, then accepted and finally directed the fake footage himself, appalled by the lack of skills of the CIA crew. The KGB soon realized that "the whole thing was a hoax", that Apollo 11 had indeed landed but it was physically impossible to make pictures in the lunar environment. Besides, they had found a photo showing a portrait of Kubrick lying on the false lunar soil in the studio.

After the success of the fake footage, Nixon gets scared that the truth might be discovered, and in a drunken state asks CIA Colonel George Kaplan to dispose of the whole film crew. The next morning he tries to cancel the order, but it is too late: meanwhile Kaplan has gone mad, sent his killers and disappeared. The death squad goes to Vietnam where the film crew has sought refuge, but is immediately caught by the villagers: despite a perfect accent and disguise, their commanding officer was black. Nixon reacts by sending 150,000 men and a half of the 6th Fleet to find and kill the four members of the crew. They fail, and the CIA takes over and assassinates all but one of them, who takes shelter in a yeshiva in Brooklyn where he dies ten years later. Only Kubrick is spared.

Five years after Apollo 11, Kubrick calls NASA to borrow the top-secret wide-aperture Zeiss lens he needs to make Barry Lyndon. As a result, Nixon's successor decides to get rid of him as the last witness of the conspiracy. Informed of the threat to his life, Kubrick locks himself up in his home and never leaves it until his death.

As a conclusion, General Vernon Walters agrees to reveal the secret of Kubrick's demise, but unexpectedly dies the next evening: he had agreed to break the CIA rule of silence and anonymity.

It is finally revealed that this is a mockumentary as the end credits roll over a montage of blooper reels, with the main participants laughing over their lines or over their inability to remember them.

== Production ==
=== Development ===
William Karel had just completed Hollywood, a film based on lying, when he and the documentary unit of Arte had the idea of making a mockumentary, to play with the serious tonality of Arte but also for pleasure, and to make a funny film based on the idea that one must not believe everything that one is told, that witnesses can lie, archives can be tricked, and that any subject can be twisted by misleading subtitling or dubbing. They looked for a topic that would be universal and historical but not sensitive like a war. Hence the choice of the Moon landing, which had for more than 30 years been a topic of debate regarding the reality of these images. They found it was a fairly funny topic.

Karel took care to avoid any conspiracist tonality. In particular, at no point is it said that Armstrong did not walk on the Moon. The script just hypothesizes that the US might have wanted a contingency plan in case the first steps could not be filmed. The arguments regarding the impossibility to operate a camera on the Moon were found in websites.

Since it was impossible to know at what point of the film the spectators would start having doubts, parodic bloopers were added in the end credits to make the hoax obvious, in case someone would believe it until the end.

=== Elements ===
The film uses four main types of elements:

- Karel interviewed Kubrick's widow, Christiane Kubrick, and his brother-in-law, Jan Harlan, pretending he was making a documentary on Kubrick, his film 2001: A Space Odyssey, the Moon or NASA, and asking intentionally vague questions. Karel also interviewed Vernon Walters, Buzz Aldrin, his wife and some NASA personnel, under the same pretext of making a bona fide documentary.
- He used footage of staff of President Richard Nixon, including Donald Rumsfeld, Henry Kissinger, Alexander Haig, Lawrence Eagleburger and CIA director Richard Helms, recycled from his earlier documentary Les hommes de la Maison Blanche and edited in order to twist their words.
- Other "witnesses" are played by actors to make the connections between the sentences pronounced by "real witnesses" and make a credible story. Among many giveaways (mainly in the second half) that the entire film is a hoax in jest, these "staging" witnesses are named after characters in Kubrick and Hitchcock films, for instance an astronaut named "David Bowman" (2001: A Space Odyssey (film)), a film producer named "Jack Torrance" (The Shining) or Nixon's secretary called "Eve Kendall" (North by Northwest).
- Other elements appearing in the second half are "borrowed" from various documentaries that are mentioned in the end credits. These are the only parts of the film in which deceptive subtitling is used: Australie, la route de Tanami (Arnaud Mansir, Hervé Rébillon, 1999), L'archipel aux savants (Laurence Graffin, 1997), Philippine: la vallée des rizières éternelles (Patrick Boitet, Jacques Massart, 1994), Cambodge: Païlin, le refuge des criminels (Hubert Dubois, 1999), Chine: union furtive (Fang Wui Wang, 2000), and Laos: les montagnards de l'opium (Eric Pierrot, 1997).

=== Special effects ===
The photo showing a portrait of Kubrick on the lunar soil is the only image in which a special effect was used.

== Giveaways ==
In addition to the increasingly incredible claims made as the film progresses, several factual errors of note are introduced by the narrator:

- John F. Kennedy's "We choose to go to the Moon" speech was in 1962, not 1961 as was claimed.
- Luna 9 landed on the Moon in February 1966, but the narrator states it was in January.
- The narrator states that Apollo 11 was launched on 17 July 1969, when in fact it was launched the day before on July 16.
- Korolev died following surgery to remove a polyp from his intestines, not from a tonsillectomy as is claimed.
- Lyndon Johnson is said to have been the Governor of Texas – an office he never held.
- Likewise, Richard Nixon is erroneously stated as having once been the Governor of California.
- The narrator implies the Cape Canaveral Air Force Station was selected in part due to the George H. W. Bush family influence in Florida, yet no Bush had any connection with Florida until 1980 when Jeb Bush moved his family there. The Cape, however, had become the new missile test facility by 1950.
- The premiere of 2001: A Space Odyssey was in April 1968 and Richard Nixon was inaugurated as president in January 1969, so the latter could not possibly take advantage of the filming of 2001 as the narrator says.
- Farouk El-Baz is presented as NASA technical director, a position he never held.

Most of the fictitious witnesses are named after characters from movies directed by Stanley Kubrick or Alfred Hitchcock. "W.A. Koenigsberg" is named after Woody Allen, who was born "Allan Koenigsberg". They are listed in the credits along with the names of the actors portraying them.

The film crew member who takes shelter in a yeshiva in Brooklyn is said to be an "acidic" Jew. In the original French version the giveaway is more obvious: it is said that "he didn't work anymore, he checked in with the Hasidic", ("Il ne travaillait plus, il pointait aux Hassidiques", which does not make sense in French but is an obvious pun between a branch of Judaism and ASSEDIC which was the French employment office at the time the film was made).

The soundtrack also includes the song "The American Dream" from Wag the Dog by Barry Levinson, a fiction feature about a secretly government-commissioned Hollywood production of a fake war. At one point, footage featuring the military boarding a plane is underscored by the "right, left, right, left" of Gunnery Sergeant Hartman (R. Lee Ermey) from Kubrick's own film, Full Metal Jacket.

The giveaway also appears in the closing credits with blooper reels showing the characters, real and fictitious alike, laughing over their lines or over their inability to remember them. But there is a final trick here, a "hoax within a hoax": the real characters are shown joking, giving the false impression that they are voluntarily part of the hoax. In fact at least one of these "jokes" - Kissinger saying that he would do it all over again - appears in Les hommes de la Maison Blanche where he turns out to be actually talking quite seriously about the war in Vietnam.

== Cast ==
=== As themselves ===
- Christiane Kubrick is Stanley Kubrick's widow.
- Jan Harlan is the executive producer for all Kubrick's films from Barry Lyndon on. He also is Christiane Kubrick's brother: they both appear discussing the "plot" of the film on the same couch.
- Henry Kissinger, Donald Rumsfeld, Alexander Haig, and Lawrence Eagleburger were members of Richard Nixon's cabinet while the latter was president.
- Edwin "Buzz" Aldrin was the second man to walk on the Moon as Apollo Lunar Module pilot of Apollo 11. The alcoholism and depression problems mentioned in the film are not fictitious: he discussed them in his autobiographic book Magnificent Desolation: The Long Journey Home from the Moon.
- Lois Aldrin was Aldrin's wife when the film was shot. They divorced in 2012.
- David Scott and Jeffrey A. Hoffman are both retired NASA astronauts. Scott walked on the Moon as commander of Apollo 15.
- Farouk El-Baz is an Egyptian American scientist who worked with NASA on the Apollo programme, on the training of the astronauts in observations and photography, the analysis of data returned from the Moon, and the supervision of the work of geoscientists and engineers in fields related to lunar exploration. Since 1986 he has been a professor and the director of the Center for Remote Sensing at Boston University. He was never technical director of NASA as said in the film.
- Richard Helms was director of the CIA during the Nixon presidency, from June 1966 to February 1973.
- Vernon Walters has a particular importance in the film because of his involvement in the Moon race, and the competition with the Soviet Union. He was interviewed because of his in-depth knowledge of these aspects. He died a week after the first interview he gave to William Karel, preventing a scheduled second interview from taking place. The sentence in the New York Herald Tribune, saying that he appeared in a French television documentary, is a fake: the actual obituary available on the web site of the New York Times says:

"He was great as our James Bond, getting us in and out secretly, even giving us code names," said Winston Lord, former president of the Council on Foreign Relations, who accompanied Mr. Kissinger to the secret talks with the Vietnamese.

Whereas the paper shown in the film says:

General Walters' last known public appearance was on a French Television documentary in which he talked about the White House's involvment [sic] with the Apollo program in the late 1960s. Both the producer and director noted that Walters was in perfect shape.

=== Fictional characters ===
The names of the fictitious witnesses and of the actors impersonating them appear in the end credits. Moreover, Arte (co-producer and original broadcaster of the film) accompanied the airing in France by a web site featuring a quiz in which the player was led to guess in which films the characters having those names originally appeared. The following list reproduces the correct answers of the quiz.

- Jack Torrance is a fictional character in Kubrick's The Shining, not a Hollywood producer, and is played by David Winger.
- David Bowman is a fictional character in Kubrick's 2001: A Space Odyssey (film), not a real astronaut, and is played by Tad Brown.
- Maria Vargas (lead character in The Barefoot Contessa) is played by Jacquelyn Toman and is not Buzz Aldrin's sister.
- Eve Kendall is a fictional character in Alfred Hitchcock's North by Northwest and was not Nixon's secretary (whose name was Rose Mary Woods), and is played by Barbara Rogers.
- Dimitri Muffley is a play on the names from Kubrick's Dr. Strangelove (Soviet Premier Dimitri Kisov and American President Merkin Muffley) and is not a "former KGB agent." He is played by Bernard Kirschoff.
- Ambrose Chapel is the name of a place in Hitchcock's The Man Who Knew Too Much, not an "ex-CIA agent", and is played by John Rogers.
- George Kaplan (mentioned by narrator) is a fictional character within a fictional character in the Hitchcock film, North By Northwest.
- W. A. Koenigsberg ("W. A." stands for "Woody Allen", as Koenigsberg is Woody Allen's true name) is played by Binem Oreg.

== Reception ==
Arte aired the film for the first time on 16 October 2002, and a second time on 1 April 2004, followed by a debate and accompanied by a web site including an interview of William Karel and a quiz demonstrating some of the giveaways including the fake witnesses and out-of-context quotes from interviews. At the press screening before the first airing, some people who had missed the beginning left the screening room infuriated.

The producer proposed the film to the BBC, who liked it but rejected it because they perceived it as being part of an "anti-American campaign" in French documentaries.

=== Moon landing conspiracy theories ===
When the film was shown to a group of sociology students studying conspiracy theories, many mistakenly believed that this was a sincere and serious film. Furthermore, Moon-landing hoax advocate Wayne Green cited the film as evidence for his views, apparently believing the out of context footage of Nixon staff was really about a Moon landing hoax, as discussed on Jay Windley's "clavius.org" site defending the reality of the Moon landings. Extracts ranging from a few minutes to the whole film stripped of the credits and key sequences have been posted on YouTube by conspiracy theorists as "proof" that, either the images on the Moon are fake, or the Moon landing itself never happened. Karel himself received e-mails congratulating him for "exposing the Moon landing hoax", which amused him.

== Awards ==
- Adolf-Grimme-Preis (Germany / 2002) for best script & director

== Influences ==
William Karel indicated that he found inspiration in Orson Welles' radio broadcast The War of the Worlds, Capricorn One, and the docudramas by Peter Watkins. He refers to Dark side of the Moon as a "documenteur", a French portmanteau word meaning "liar documentary" (from documentaire "documentary" + menteur "liar"), after the title of a film made by Agnès Varda in 1980–1981.

Other influences are the staging of well-known historical events for the camera, such as the raising of the flags at Iwo-Jima and at the Reichstag, the American landing in Somalia which was remade a couple of times for the cameras, exemplifying the influence of cinema on news coverage.

== See also ==
- Apollo 11 in popular culture
- Moon landing conspiracy theories in popular culture
- Capricorn One — a thriller film about faked Mars landing but failed re-entry leading to a murder conspiracy
- Wag the Dog — a comedy-drama film about war being faked in a studio

== Literature ==
- Taylor, Henry M. (2007): More than a Hoax. William Karel's Critical Mockumentary Dark Side of the Moon. In: Post Script, 26:3, p. 88–101.
