= Stanley Hoffmann =

French-American political scientist (1928–2015)

- Hoffmann in 2002
- Born: 27 November 1928; Vienna, Austria
- Died: 13 September 2015 (aged 86); Cambridge, Massachusetts, U.S.
- Citizenship: French
- Education: Sciences Po; University of Paris
- Scientific career
- Fields: Political science
- Workplaces: Harvard University, School for Advanced Studies in the Social Sciences

Stanley Hoffmann (27 November 1928 – 13 September 2015) was a French political scientist and the Paul and Catherine Buttenwieser University Professor at Harvard University, specializing in French politics and society, European politics, U.S. foreign policy, and international relations.

== Biography ==
Hoffmann was born in Vienna in 1928 and moved to France with his family the following year. He was born to a distant American father and an Austrian mother. The Nazis classified Hoffmann and his mother as Jewish, forcing them to flee Paris in 1940. They fled to the village of Lamalou-les-Bains in the south of France, where they spent the war hiding from the Gestapo. A French citizen since 1947, Hoffmann spent his childhood between Paris and Nice before studying at Sciences Po, graduating at the top of his class in 1948. He also obtained a doctorate at the Faculty of Law of Paris in 1953.

In 1955, Hoffmann became an instructor in the Department of Government at Harvard. After some years, he received tenure. He was appointed C. Douglas Dillon Professor of the Civilization of France. He was elected to the American Academy of Arts and Sciences in 1964. He founded Harvard's Center for European Studies in 1969 (later the Minda de Gunzburg Center for European Studies). In 1978, he belonged as a guest professor to Sciences Po Seminary of Political Ideas and History managed by pr Raoul Girardet and devoted to the intellectual origins of fascism . His main fields of specialization were French politics and society, European politics, U.S. foreign policy, and international relations. He was elected to the American Philosophical Society in 1981. In 1997, Hoffmann was named the Paul and Catherine Buttenwieser University Professor. In addition to his teaching and prolific writing, Hoffmann also participated as an expert in the film The World According to Bush, dealing with the vicissitudes of the Bush administration after the 2000 presidential election. In 1996, Hoffmann received the Balzan Prize for Political Science: Contemporary International Relations from the International Balzan Foundation of Italy and Switzerland. On September 13, 2015, Hoffmann died in Cambridge, Massachusetts at age 86.

== Major publications ==
=== As sole author ===
- Le Mouvement Poujade, (Paris, Armand Collin, 1956)
- The State of War: Essays on the Theory and Practice of International Politics (Praeger, 1965).
- Gulliver's Troubles: or, the Setting of American Foreign Policy (McGraw-Hill, 1968).
- "International Organization and the International System," International Organization, Vol. 24 No. 3, Summer 1970.
- Decline or Renewal? France since the 1930s (Viking Press, 1974).
- Primacy or World Order: American Foreign Policy since the Cold War (McGraw-Hill, 1978).
- Duties beyond Borders: On the Limits and Possibilities of Ethical International Politics (Syracuse University Press, 1981).
- Dead Ends: American Foreign Policy in the New Cold War (Ballinger Publishing, 1983).
- Janus and Minerva: Essays in the Theory and Practice of International Politics (Westview Press, 1987).
- The European Sisyphus: Essays on Europe, 1964-1994 (Westview Press, 1995).
- World Disorders: Troubled Peace in the Post-Cold War Era (Rowman & Littlefield, 1998).
- World Disorders: Troubled Peace in the Post-Cold War Era Updated ed.,(Rowman & Littlefield, 2000).

=== Collaborative work ===
- In Search of France, with Charles Kindleberger, Laurence Wylie, Jesse Pitts, Jean-Baptiste Duroselle, and François Goguel (Harvard University Press, 1963; Harper Torchbook ed., 1965).
- The Ethics and Politics of Humanitarian Intervention, with Robert C. Johansen, James P. Sterba, and Raimo Vayrynen (University of Notre Dame Press, 1996).
- Gulliver Unbound: America's Imperial Temptation and the War in Iraq, with Frédéric Bozo (Rowman & Littlefield, 2004).

=== As sole editor ===
- Contemporary Theory in International Relations (Prentice-Hall, 1960).

=== As co-editor ===
- The Relevance of International Law: Essays in honor of Leo Gross, co-edited with Karl W. Deutsch (Schenkman Publishing, 1968).
- Culture and Society in Contemporary Europe: A Casebook, co-edited with Paschalis Kitromilides (Allen & Unwin, 1981).
- The Impact of the Fifth Republic on France, co-edited with William G. Andrews (State University of New York Press, 1981).
- The Marshall Plan: A Retrospective, co-edited with Charles Maier (Westview Press, 1984).
- The Rise of the Nazi Regime: Historical Reassessments, co-edited with Charles S. Maier and Andrew Gould (Westview Press, 1986).
- The Mitterrand Experiment: Continuity and Change in Modern France, co-edited with George Ross and Sylvia Malzacher (Polity, 1987).
- Rousseau on International Relations, co-edited with David P. Fidler (Oxford University Press, 1991).
- The New European Community: Decisionmaking and Institutional Change, co-edited with Robert O. Keohane (Westview Press, 1991).
- After the Cold War: International Institutions and State Strategies in Europe, 1989-1991, co-edited with Robert O. Keohane and Joseph S. Nye (Harvard University Press, 1993).
