= Duties Beyond Borders =

1981 book by Stanley Hoffmann

- Author: Stanley Hoffmann
- Language: English
- Genre: international relations, ethics literature
- Publisher: Syracuse University Press
- Publication date: June 1981
- Publication place: United States
- Media type: Print
- Pages: 252
- ISBN: 0-8156-0168-9
- OCLC: 7277768
- Preceded by: Primacy or World Order: American Foreign Policy since the Cold War
- Followed by: Dead Ends: American Foreign Policy in the New Cold War

Duties Beyond Borders (full title: Duties Beyond Borders: On the Limits and Possibilities of Ethical International Politics) is a book by Stanley Hoffmann published in 1981 which focuses on the application of ethical principles to international relations. The book won the Le Prix Adolphe Bentinck for 1982 for "the book which most contributes to the unity and cause of peace in Europe". The book is based upon a series of lectures which Hoffmann gave at Syracuse University between February and April 1980.

== See also ==
- Cosmopolitanism
- Just and Unjust Wars
