= Bochum Observatory =

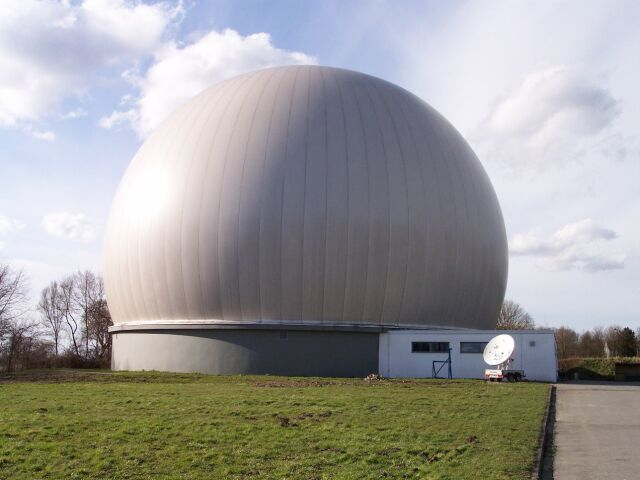
- The Radome of Bochum Observatory
- Location: Bochum
- Coordinates: 51°25′37″N 7°11′33″E
- Established: 1946
- Website: http://www.die-erde-im-visier.de/
- Related media on Commons

Bochum Observatory, often known in Bochum as Cape Kaminski (German: Kap Kaminski) is a research institute in Bochum, Nordrhein-Westfalen, Germany. The institution came into being through a private initiative. Its main areas of interest are in radio astronomy and environmental research.

== History and accomplishments ==
In 1946, Professor Heinz Kaminski founded Bochum Observatory as a popular observatory of the local Volkshochschule. Since 1957 and the launch of the first artificial satellite – Sputnik 1, whose signal was detected in Bochum – this developed into the Institute for Space Research / Observatory Bochum. It was renamed in 1982 as the Institute for Environment- and Future Research [Institut für Umwelt- und Zukunftsforschung (IUZ)]. Included among its new tasks are involvement with sociological und global ecological themes. It is a recognized and supported further education institution of the Land of Nordrhein-Westfalen. Its educational work is aided by the Landeszentrale for Political Education of the Ministry for Economic Affairs and Employment of the Land of Nordrhein-Westfalen.

In 1999, Professor Heinz Kaminski nominated Thilo Elsner as his successor. Thilo Elsner has been at the Observatory since February 1995 and has contributed significantly to the maintenance and reconstruction of the attached radar dome Radome. The radar dome, which is supported by internal pressure, collapsed in October 1999 due to a large rip in the polyester skin. Heinz Kaminski died in 2002.

In 2007, the observatory celebrated its 60th anniversary.

In March 2009 the 20m parabolic antenna became the first successful planetary radar in western Europe when it detected its own echoes from the Planet Venus. As a result, the American Space Agency NASA has offered its assistance and in future will be sending relevant data to Bochum.

== Equipment ==
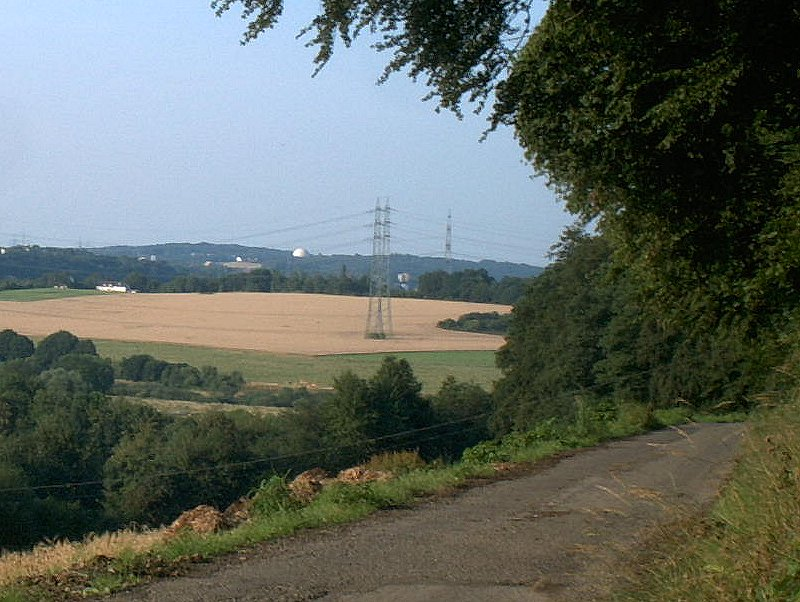
Sternwarte Bochum (View from Hattingen)

The Institute today owns several antenna systems for receiving data from geostationary and orbiting satellites and interplanetary spacecraft. The development of astronomical topics as well as environmental themes and the study of its associated effects on society is promoted and made accessible to the public at large. This latter task is carried out with the help of a "Mobile Observatory", which consists among things of a high-precision satellite receiver. Recognized as working for the community, the institute has worked since 1990 for the people of the Ruhr area as an institution for political education in the Land of Nordrhein-Westfalen.

The IUZ's largest structure is the Radome (radar dome). This has a 40-meter-high (130 ft) dome, supported by excess pressure from inside, which protects a 20 m parabolic dish from the weather. The dish has a total weight of over 220 tonnes and can both receive and send data. As a result of a complete upgrading, the installation has an accuracy of about 1/1000 of a degree in positioning and is thus being prepared for the planned Mars mission AMSAT P5A, which will be partly navigated by the IUZ Bochum. Otherwise there is 1000 square meters of exhibition space and a lecture room for 160 people.

== Long-term exhibition ==
Cosmos, Communism, Cold War – Sputnik 50: The History of Space Travel in Two Political Systems is the exhibition in the Radom of Bochum Observatory, supported by the "Federal Foundation for Studying the SED-Dictatorship". It documents the events of the Space Race from the first detection of the Sputnik signal in 1957 up to the present day. "The People's Observatory Bochum", one of the few institutions capable of receiving the first signals from Sputnik, became an important place in West Germany for the latest news and information about space. A special exhibition has been put on show in this historic location in space history, with numerous exhibits gathered from all of Germany documenting the instrumentation of space travel."
