= Heinz Kaminski =

German chemical engineer and space researcher (1921-2002)

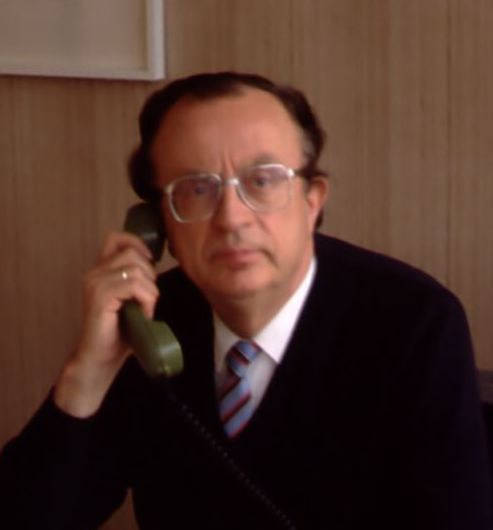
- Born: 15 June 1921; Bochum, Germany
- Died: 17 February 2002 (aged 80); Arnsberg

Heinz Kaminski (15 June 1921 – 17 February 2002) was a German chemical engineer and space researcher.

== Biography ==
Heinz Kaminski founded and later directed the Bochum Observatory. He also busied himself with environmental research. Although Kaminski was only an amateur astronomer and not a professional, the press constantly treated him as a source of information on astronomical events. At the end of the 1970s and the beginning of the 1980s, Kaminski took an active interest in politics - at first in the Green Party, then in the Bürgerpartei.

In the cellar of his house, Kaminski, a former naval radio operator, had built a receiving station from old wooden tables and in the meadow in front of his house in the Bochum district of Sundern erected an antenna assisted by three co-workers, with whose help he listened in to radio signals from space. During the night of 7 October 1957, Kaminski receive signals from Sputnik 1, the first artificial satellite in space. Even he was not the first person outside the Soviet territories, as an urban myth in Bochum tells, nor the first person in Germany, he and Bochum becomes very popular about this fact.

In 1961, Kaminski took over the leadership of the Volkssternwarte Bochum (Bochum People's Observatory), which had been founded by himself. During the years he built the grounds around the Volkssternwarte into an Institute and made sure that it managed a connection to international space research. At the Bochum Station, signals from a variety of space vehicles from the Sputniks, Luniks up to Vostok and Voskhod could be received, as well as in 1963 (for the first time in Europe) satellite pictures from the US weather satellite TIROS-8. In 1967 Kaminski installed a 20-metre (66 ft) parabolic antenna in a radome, with which all Apollo missions were followed. When his Institut was denied subsidies in 1982, Kaminski changed the Volkssternwarte Bochum into the private "Institut für Umwelt- und Zukunftsforschung" (IUZ) (Institute for Environmental and Future Research), which over the years has developed into a top-rate educational institution.

Due to the efforts of Kaminski, the city of Bochum erected in 1964 the first post-war large planetarium in Deutschland (equipped at the time with a Zeiss Mod. IV). Kaminski was nominated as the first direktor and occupied this position until his retirement in 1986.

In 1972 Kaminski became an honorary professor in the Physics Department at the University of Essen and gave lectures until the Winter semester 1999/2000 on "Environmental Research via Satellite - Results and Political Consequences".

On 17 February 2002, Kaminski died at the age of 80. He had three children.
